This list of fictional robots and androids is chronological, and categorised by medium. It includes all depictions of robots, androids and gynoids in literature, television, and cinema; however, robots that have appeared in more than one form of media are not necessarily listed in each of those media. This list is intended for all fictional computers which are described as existing in a humanlike or mobile form. It shows how the concept has developed in the human imagination through history.

Robots and androids have frequently been depicted or described in works of fiction. The word "robot" itself comes from a work of fiction, Karel Čapek's play, R.U.R. (Rossum's Universal Robots), written in 1920 and first performed in 1921.

Theatre

 Coppélia, a life-size dancing doll in the ballet of the same name, choreographed by Marius Petipa with music by Léo Delibes (1870)
 The word robot comes from Karel Čapek's play, R.U.R. (Rossum's Universal Robots), written in 1920 in Czech and first performed in 1921. Performed in New York 1922 and an English edition published in 1923. In the play, the word refers to artificially created life forms. Named robots in the play are Marius, Sulla, Radius, Primus, Helena, and Damon. The play introduced and popularized the term "robot". Čapek's robots are biological machines that are assembled, as opposed to grown or born.

Literature

19th century and earlier
 The woman forged out of gold in Finnish myth The Kalevala (prehistoric folklore)
 From 600 BC onward, legends of talking bronze and clay statues coming to life have been a regular occurrence in the works of classical authors such as Homer, Plato, Pindar, Tacitus, and Pliny. In Book 18 of the Iliad, Hephaestus the god of all mechanical arts, was assisted by two moving female statues made from gold – "living young damsels, filled with minds and wisdoms". Another legend has Hephaestus being commanded by Zeus to create the first woman, Pandora, out of clay. The myth of Pygmalion, king of Cyprus, tells of a lonely man who sculpted his ideal woman, Galatea, from ivory, and promptly fell in love with her after the goddess Aphrodite brought her to life.
 Talos, bronze giant Talos in Apollonius of Rhodes' Argonautica, 3rd century BCE
 Brazen heads, attributed to numerous scholars involved in the introduction of Arabian science to medieval Europe, particularly Roger Bacon (13th century)
 Golem – The legend of the Golem, an animated man of clay, is mentioned in the Talmud. (16th century)
 Talus, "iron man" who mechanically helps Arthegall dispense justice in The Faerie Queene, the epic poem by Edmund Spenser, published in 1590
 Olimpia, automaton who captivates the hero Nathanael so much he wishes to marry her in E. T. A. Hoffmann's Der Sandmann (1814)
 Artificial human-like being created by Victor Frankenstein in Mary Shelley's Frankenstein (1818)
 A mechanical man powered by steam in Edward S. Ellis' The Steam Man of the Prairies (1865)
 Olympia in Act I of Jacques Offenbach's The Tales of Hoffmann, based on the Hoffmann story (1881)
 A mechanical man run by electricity in Luis Senarens' Frank Reade and his Electric Man (1885)
 Hadaly, a mechanical woman run by electricity, in Auguste Villiers de l'Isle-Adam's The Future Eve (1886) – the novel credited with popularizing the word "android"
 "The Brazen Android" by William Douglas O'Connor. First appeared in The Atlantic Monthly, April 1891
 The Dancing Partner by Jerome K.Jerome of Three Men in a Boat fame (1893)
 The mecha-like tripods that the Martians use to conquer the Earth in The War of the Worlds by H.G. Wells (1897) 
 "The New Frankenstein" by Ernest Edward Kellett (1899), in which an inventor creates an "anti-phonograph" that according to the narrator "can give the appropriate answer to every question I put", and installs in it a robotic female body that "will guide herself, answer questions, talk and eat like a rational being, in fact, perform the part of a society lady." The android proves convincing enough to fool two suitors who wish to marry her.

Early 1900s
 The "Metal Men" automata designed by a Thomas Edison-like scientist in Gustave Le Rouge's La Conspiration des Milliardaires (1899–1900)
 Tik-Tok and Iron giant from L. Frank Baum's Ozma of Oz (1907). The movie Return to Oz, largely based on Ozma of Oz.
 A robot chess-player in Moxon's Master by Ambrose Bierce (first published in the San Francisco Examiner on 16 Aug. 1899)
 In Gaston Leroux's La Poupée Sanglante (The Bloody Doll) and La Machine à Assassiner (The Murdering Machine), the lead character, Bénédict Masson, is wrongly accused of murder and guillotined. His brain is later attached to an automaton created by scientist Jacques Cotentin, and Masson goes on to track and punish those who caused his death.

1920s
 R.U.R. (Rossum's Universal Robots) (1921), by Karel Čapek – credited with coining the term "robot". In its original Czech, "robota" means forced labour, and is derived from "rab", meaning "slave." R.U.R. depicts the first elaborate depiction of a machine take-over. Čapek's robots can also be seen as the first androids: they are in fact organic.
 Le Singe (The Monkey) (1925), by Maurice Renard and Albert Jean, imagined the creation of artificial lifeforms through the process of "radiogenesis", a sort of human electrocopying or cloning process.
 The Metal Giants (1926), by Edmond Hamilton, in which a computer brain who runs on atomic power creates an army of 300-foot-tall robots.
 Metropolis (1927), by Thea von Harbou as novel, by Fritz Lang as film, character Maria and her robot double.
 Automata (1929), by S. Fowler Wright, about machines doing the humans' jobs before wiping them out.

1930s
 The "Professor Jameson" series by Neil R. Jones (early 1930s) featured human and alien minds preserved in robot bodies. It was reprinted in five Ace paperbacks in the late 1960s: The Planet of the Double Sun, The Sunless World, Space War, Twin Worlds and Doomsday on Ajiat.
 Zat the Martian robot, protagonist of John Wyndham's short story "The Lost Machine" (1932)
 Human cyborgs in Revolt of the Pedestrians by David H. Keller (1932)
 Robot surgeon in "Rex" by Harl Vincent (1934)
 Killer robot in "The Vanishing Shadow" film serial (1934) 
 "Helen O'Loy" from the story of the same title by Lester del Rey (1938)
 Adam Link of I, Robot by Eando Binder (1938)
 Robots discover their "roots" in Robots Return by Robert Moore Williams (1938).
 Robot as murder witness in True Confession by F. Orlin Tremaine (1939)

1940s
 Gnut in Farewell to the Master by Harry Bates (1940), later made into the classic 1951 science fiction film The Day the Earth Stood Still
 Unnamed "living plastic" robot in "Vault of the Beast" (1940), short story by A. E. van Vogt
 Jay Score ("J20"), emergency pilot of the Earth-to-Venus freighter Upskadaska City (colloquially called "Upsydaisy") in "Jay Score", a short story by Eric Frank Russell in the May 1941 issue of Astounding Science Fiction (1941)
 Jenkins in City by Clifford D. Simak (1944)
 Alojzy Gąbka in Akademia Pana Kleksa  by Jan Brzechwa (1946), a mischievous mechanical doll able to pass as a human boy, and the main adversary of the protagonist, Mr Blot.
 Robots by Isaac Asimov:
 Robbie, Speedy, Cutie, and others, from the stories in I, Robot (1940–1950) (not to be confused with the Binder short story of the same title)
 L-76, Z-1, Z-2, Z-3, Emma-2, Brackenridge, Tony, Lenny, Ez-27 and others, from the stories in The Rest of the Robots (1964)
 R. Daneel Olivaw from The Caves of Steel (1954) and subsequent novels
 R. Giskard Reventlov from The Robots of Dawn (1983) and subsequent novels
 Andrew Martin from The Bicentennial Man (1976) (later made into a film) and The Positronic Man (a novel), co-written by Asimov and Robert Silverberg
 Norby in a series of books for children and adolescents, co-written with Janet Asimov
 The Humanoids from two novels by Jack Williamson (1949 and 1980)

1950s and 1960s
 Astro Boy, series by Osamu Tezuka (published in Japan but available in English), an atomic-powered robot of 100,000 horsepower built to resemble a little boy, most specifically Tobio, the deceased son of Dr. Tenma. When not in school, Astro Boy spent his time dealing with robots & aliens. (1952)
 The Gallegher series of stories by Lewis Padgett (Henry Kuttner and C. L. Moore) collected in Robots Have No Tails (1952)
 The Mechanical Hound from Fahrenheit 451 by Ray Bradbury (1953)
 Bors, an old government integration robot pivotal to Philip K. Dick's novelette The Last of the Masters (1954)
 The Fury, a large steel robot that acts as jailer and executioner, in Henry Kuttner's "Two-Handed Engine" (1955)
 Zane Gort, a robot novelist in the short story "The Silver Eggheads" by Fritz Leiber (1959)
 SHROUD (Synthetic Human, Radiation OUtput Determined) and SHOCK (Synthetic Human Object, Casualty Kinematics), the sentient test dummies in the novel V. by Thomas Pynchon (1963)
 Frost, the Beta-Machine, Mordel, and the Ancient Ore Crusher in Roger Zelazny's short story "For a Breath I Tarry" (1966)
 Trurl and Klapaucius, the robot geniuses of The Cyberiad (Cyberiada, 1967; translated by Michael Kandel 1974) – collection of humorous stories about the exploits of Trurl and Klapaucius, "constructors" among robots
 The Iron Man in the novel The Iron Man: A Children's Story in Five Nights by Ted Hughes, illustrated by Andrew Davidson (1968), later changed to The Iron Giant to avoid confusion with its predecessor, the comic superhero of the same name
 Roy Batty, Pris, Rachael and several other Nexus-6 model androids. "Androids, fully organic in nature – the products of genetic engineering – and so human-like that they can only be distinguished by psychological tests; some of them don't even know that they're not human." – Do Androids Dream of Electric Sheep? by Philip K. Dick (1968)
 Diktor, the robotic lover in the comics and film Barbarella (1968) 
 "The Electric Grandmother" in the short story of the same name, from I Sing the Body Electric by Ray Bradbury (1969), based on a 1962 Twilight Zone episode of the same name
 Mech Eagles from the novel Logan's Run (1967), robotic eagles designed to track and kill people who refuse to die at age 21
 Richard Daniel, an intensely loyal, old, un-remodeled robot, belonging to one family for generations, in "All the Traps of Earth" by Clifford Simak. When the last of his entire extended family of owners died, after 200 years, he is required by law to be disassembled; humans who made the law are still threatened by robots who are superior to them in functionality. He is sentient enough to take exception to that policy.
 Jenkins, the robot who served generations of the Webster family for nearly a thousand years, then the dogs modified by one of the Websters, dogs capable of reading and speech, who inherited the earth when humans left it by various methods, through all of the stories contained in the collection "City" by Clifford Simak. Humans entered "the sleep", or had their bodies converted to Jovian lifeforms to live on Jupiter.

1970s
 Personoids, in Stanisław Lem's book Próżnia Doskonała (1971). This is a collection of book reviews of nonexistent books, and was translated into English by Michael Kandel as A Perfect Vacuum (1983). "Personoids do not need any human-like physical body; they are rather an abstraction of functions of human mind, they live in computers."
 The Stepford Wives (1972) by Ira Levin – "The masculine plot to replace women with perfect looking, obedient robot replicas"
 Setaur, Aniel and Terminus in Tales of Pirx the Pilot by Stanisław Lem (1973)
 The Hangman in Home Is the Hangman by Roger Zelazny (1975), winner of that year's Nebula Award for Best Novella
 Andrew Martin from The Bicentennial Man (1976) by Isaac Asimov, and The Positronic Man (1992) by Asimov and Robert Silverberg
 All the droids from the Star Wars franchise (since 1977 for the main canon, 1976 for the Expanded Universe)
 Marvin the Paranoid Android in The Hitchhiker's Guide to the Galaxy (1979) by Douglas Adams and subsequent novels based on the original radio series
 K-9 in Doctor Who (1977-1981)

1980s
 Chip, the robot teenager in the Not Quite Human series (1985–1986) by Seth McEvoy. Disney later made the book into three movies.
 Roderick (1980) and Tik-Tok (1983) by John Sladek, two extreme examples of robot morality, one perfectly innocent and one perfectly criminal 
 The Boppers, a race of moon-based robots that achieve independence from humanity, in the series of books The Ware Tetralogy by Rudy Rucker
 R. Giskard Reventlov from The Robots of Dawn (1983) and subsequent novels by Isaac Asimov
 All Autobots and Decepticons  from the Transformers franchise (since 1984)
 Elio, a character from A Tale of Time City (1987) by Diana Wynne Jones
 Manders in The Type One Super Robot (1987), a children's book by Alison Prince
 Solo from Robert Mason's novels Weapon (1989) and Solo (1993) – Note, the 1996 film titled Solo is based solely on the first novel, Weapon.
 Sheen, a female android mysteriously programmed to guard and love Stile, a serf on the planet Proton, in the sci-fi/fantasy series Apprentice Adept (1980–82) by Piers Anthony.
 Spofforth, the dean of New York University in Mockingbird by Walter Tevis.

1990s
 Yod in Marge Piercy's He, She and It (1991)
 The One Who Waits in Charles Sheffield's Divergence (1991)
 Caliban in a trilogy by Roger MacBride Allen, set in the robots universe of Isaac Asimov (1993)
 Solo and Nimrod in Robert Mason's novel Solo (1993)
 Jay-Dub and Dee Model in Ken MacLeod's The Stone Canal (1996)
 Dorfl, and other Discworld golems deliberately described in terms reminiscent of an Asimovian robot, in Terry Pratchett's Feet of Clay (1996) and subsequent Discworld novels

2000s
 Cassandra Kresnov, in a series by Joel Shepherd (2001)
 Clunk, in a series by Simon Haynes (2004)
 Moravecs, sentient descendants of probes sent by humans to the Jovian belt, in Dan Simmons' Ilium 
 Canti, one of the robots built by Medical Mechanica in FLCL
(2003)
 Nimue Alban/Merlin Athrawes, in the Safehold series by David Weber (2007)
 Otis, the robot dog from Tanith Lee's Indigara (2007)
 Freya, in Charles Stross' Saturn's Children (2008)
 HCR-328 and Tom in Automatic Lover and Automatic Lover – Ten Years On by Ariadne Tampion (2008)
 Boilerplate, a Victorian-era robot in the illustrated coffee-table book Boilerplate: History's Mechanical Marvel, published by Abrams (2009)

2010s
 Adam, one of the first commercially available androids in Ian McEwan's Machines Like Me (2019)
 The Calculators, an ancient, ongoing family of androids in Paul Levinson's Robinson Calculator novelette (2019)
Murderbot, a newly independent security robot in The Murderbot Diaries series by Martha Wells (2017-)

Radio
 Marvin the Paranoid Android in The Hitchhiker's Guide to the Galaxy BBC radio series (1978–1980)
 Tidy, George, Fagor, Surgeon General Kraken and miscellaneous other androids from James Follett's Earthsearch BBC radio series (1980–1981)
 Fetchers, accident prone and apologetic gopher robots from the BBC radio series Nineteen Ninety-Four (1985)

Music
 Mr. Roboto, the prison robot in the eponymous song from the rock opera Kilroy Was Here by Styx (1983)
 Rapbot, a robot built for rapping, but with various other functions, including a toaster, from Fake Songs by Liam Lynch (2003)
 Cindi Mayweather, the protagonist from the "Metropolis" concept series by Janelle Monáe (2007)
 Cyborg Noodle, the cyborg clone of Noodle from the virtual band Gorillaz who was created for the storyline of their album Plastic Beach (2010)
 Rovix, K-pop group VIXX's robotic mascot (2012)

Film

1940s and earlier

 The Dummy, played by Ben Turpin in A Clever Dummy, a Sennett silent short dating from 1917 when the term "robot" did not yet exist
 The Master Mystery, a 1919 theatrical serial starring Harry Houdini, featuring a fully realized mechanical man (implemented as a costumed actor)
 The Mechanical Man from the Italian silent film of the same name, directed by André Deed (1921)
 Maria/Futura, the Maschinenmensch, a robotic gynoid, played by German actress Brigitte Helm in both her robotic-appearing and human-appearing forms in Metropolis, the silent science fiction film by famed Austrian-German director Fritz Lang (1927)
 The Vanishing Shadow, Features a 7 foot tall robot programmed to be an assassin. (1934)
 Arbeitsmaschine and Kampfmaschine, working robots and fighting robots in the German movie Der Herr der Welt (1934) by Harry Piel; the mad scientist Professor Wolf (Walter Franck) is eventually killed by his fighting robot
 The Phantom Empire, A 12-chapter Mascot Pictures serial combined the Western, musical and fantasy genres.(1935)
 The Tin Man, voiced by Billy Bletcher ("My name is robot!") from the Roach comedy short of the same name featuring Thelma Todd and Patsy Kelly (1935) 
 Loss of Sensation, A film centering around a man who invents inexhaustible robots to replace humans working in factories (1935)
 Annihilants, robot soldiers belonging to Ming the Merciless in the Flash Gordon film series (1936)
 Volkites, robotic henchmen of the Atlantean tyrant Unga Khan in Undersea Kingdom (1936)
 Iron Man, An 8 foot tall robot created by Dr. Alex Zorka in The Phantom Creeps (1939)
 Steel "Killer" Robot in director William Witney's early 1940s film serial of 15 episodes Mysterious Doctor Satan (a.k.a. Doctor Satan's Robot) (1940, re-released in full-length 1966)
 The Mechanical Monsters in the Superman short of the same name (1941)
 The Monster and the Ape Features the "Metalagon Man" a stolen robot (1945)

1950s
 Gort, the robot in the film The Day the Earth Stood Still (1951) (loosely based on Gnut, the robot protagonist of "Farewell to the Master" by Harry Bates, the original short story upon which the movie is based)
 Mark 1 in Mother Riley Meets the Vampire (1952)
 Ro-Man, a robot bent on destroying earth, in the movie Robot Monster (1952)
 The Twonky (1953)
 Nyah's robot, Chani, in the British film Devil Girl from Mars (1954)
 Tobor, a robot created to replace astronauts in space in the film Tobor the Great (1954)
 Venusian robots invading Earth in Target Earth (1954)
 Robby the Robot in Forbidden Planet (1956) and The Invisible Boy (1957)
 Kronos (1957)
 Moguera, a large, mole-like robot in The Mysterians (1957) and several subsequent Japanese films
 Colossus in The Colossus of New York (1958) 
 The Human Robot in The Robot vs. The Aztec Mummy (1958)

1960s
 Omega in First Spaceship on Venus (1960)
 Neptune Men, robotic aliens in Invasion of the Neptune Men, starring a young Sonny Chiba (1961)
  Robot John in Planet of Storms (1962), Voyage to the Planet of Prehistoric Women (1965) and Voyage to the Planet of Prehistoric Women (1968)
The Humanoids (or "Clickers") in The Creation of the Humanoids (1962) 
 Talos in Jason and the Argonauts (1963)
 Alien robots invade Earth in The Earth Dies Screaming. (1964)
 Torg in Santa Claus Conquers the Martians (1964)
 Frank Saunders (a.k.a. "Frankenstein"), an android version of Frankenstein's monster in Frankenstein Meets the Space Monster (1965)
 Sexbots or Fembots, including Robot # 11 (Diane) in Dr. Goldfoot and the Bikini Machine (1965) and Dr. Goldfoot and the Girl Bombs (1966), both starring Vincent Price
 Cyborg Garth A7 in Cyborg 2087 (1966)
Robot Operator in The Terrornauts (1967)
  Mechani-Kong in King Kong Escapes (1967)
 Robot army in Superargo and the Faceless Giants (1968)

1970s
 The American defense computer Colossus that takes over the world in Colossus: The Forbin Project (1970)
 The all-robot police force in THX 1138 (1971)
 Huey, Dewey and Louie, drones in Silent Running (1972) – notable as the first movie in which non-humanoid robots were made mobile by manning them with amputees
 Jet Jaguar in Godzilla vs. Megalon (1973)
 The Gunslinger (played by Yul Brynner) and other androids in Westworld (1973) and Futureworld (1976)
 The robots in Sleeper (1973)
 Mechagodzilla in various [[Godzilla (franchise)|Godzilla vs. Mechagodzilla]] (1974)
 The Stepford Wives (1975) – Joanna Eberhart and other women are being replaced with identical robots.
 Box in Logan's Run (1976)
 Necron-99, later called "Peace" from Ralph Bakshi's Wizards (1977)
 Proteus IV from Demon Seed (1977), an AI computer developed by Alex Harris, that eventually rapes the scientist's wife to be immortal
 C-3PO, R2-D2 and all the droids from the Star Wars franchise (since 1977 for the main canon, 1976 for the Expanded Universe)
 Robot Overlord from the 1977 Italian film Cosmos: War of the Planets 
 Alien robot army threatens Earth in Starship Invasions. (1977)
 Aliens' robot army invades Earth in the Italian film War of the Robots. (1978)
 Beba-2 in Message from Space (1978)
 Elle and the Giant Robot in Starcrash (1978)
 Sparks, Lomax and others from the 1979 Canadian film H. G. Wells' The Shape of Things to Come Ash in Alien (1979)
 Hermes, an android double of his creator, in Unidentified Flying Oddball (1979)
 C.H.O.M.P.S. (Canine HOMe Protection System), a robotic dog invented by his young owner (1979)
 Tilk, Tilly and others in the 1979 Italian film Star Odyssey Ilia probe, a gynoid double of the original Ilia in Star Trek: The Motion Picture (1979)
 V.I.N.CENT (Vital Information Necessary CENTralized), B.O.B. (BiO-sanitation Battalion), Maximillian and the androids made out of humans in The Black Hole (1979)

1980s
 Hector in Saturn 3 (1980)
 Galaxina (1980), with Dorothy Stratten in the title role
 Bubo, a mechanical owl in Clash of the Titans (1981)
 The robot who had sex with a secretary in Heavy Metal (1981)
 Val, Aqua, Phil and others from  Heartbeeps (1981)
 The replicants Roy Batty, Pris, Leon Kowalski, Zhora, Rachael, and Rick Deckard in Blade Runner (1982) (the film version of Do Androids Dream of Electric Sheep?)
 The Recognizers, police robots in Tron (1982)
 Max 404 and Cassandra One in Android (1982)
 Conal Cochran's androids who serve central antagonists/villains in Halloween III: Season of the Witch, a non-Halloween consecutive film
 Beta, an android left on Earth impersonating Alex Rogan while he is in space in The Last Starfighter (1984)
 T-800, the robot assassin in The Terminator (1984)
 Robot Spiders and various other robots, maliciously reprogrammed to kill in Runaway (1984)
 D.A.R.Y.L. (Data Analyzing Robot Youth Lifeform), a robot built to the government to look like a ten-year-old boy in the film D.A.R.Y.L. (1985)
 Tik-Tok in Return to Oz (1985)
 Sico, Paulie's robot in Rocky IV (1985)
 Spot in Eliminators (1986) 
 Killbots in Chopping Mall (1986)
 Johnny 5 and the other S-A-I-N-T (Strategic-Artificially-Intelligent-Nuclear-Transport) military robots in Short Circuit (1986) and Short Circuit 2 (1988) and later Hot Cars, Cold Facts (1990)
 Jinx from the film SpaceCamp (1986)
 Bishop in Aliens (1986)
 R.A.L.F. (Robotic Assistant Labor Facilitator) and MAX (TriMAXion Drone Ship) in Flight of the Navigator (1986)
 BB and Samantha in Deadly Friend (1986)
 Ulysses, an android in the film Making Mr. Right (1987)
 Chip in the Not Quite Human movie adaptions based on the books by Seth McEvoy (1987)
 Dot Matrix in Spaceballs (1987) 
 Toaster and Kirby in The Brave Little Toaster film series (1987-1997)
 ED-209 in RoboCop (1987)
 Data, positronic brain android from Star Trek: The Next Generation (1987-2002)
 R.O.T.O.R. (1987), the main antagonist of the movie of the same title
 The "fix-its" in *batteries not included (1987)
 Lore, Data's older brother Star Trek: The Next Generation (1988-1990)
 Cherry 2000 (1988), with Pamela Gidley in the title role

1990s
 Quinn and DV-8 from Crash and Burn (1990)
 Lal, Data offspring Star Trek: The Next Generation (1990)
 MARK13 in Hardware (1990)
 The Enforcer Drone from the 1990 film Spaced Invaders Johnny Cab from Total Recall (1990)
 Pino Petto from Silent Night, Deadly Night 5: The Toy Maker (1991)
 T-800 and T-1000, model Terminators played respectively by Arnold Schwarzenegger and Robert Patrick in Terminator 2: Judgment Day (1991)
 The good and evil robotic doubles of Bill and Ted in Bill & Ted's Bogus Journey (1991)
 Newman in And You Thought Your Parents Were Weird (1991) 
 Eve from Eve of Destruction (1991)
 Mecha-King Ghidorah, a cyborg from Godzilla vs. King Ghidorah (1991)
 Alsatia Zevo, the gynoid sister of Leslie Zevo and dollmaker in Toys (1992)
 Bishop in Alien 3 (1992)
 Otomo, android ninjas from RoboCop 3 (1993)
 The Sterilisation Units in A.P.E.X. (1994)
 J5 in Blankman (1994)
 Wallace's Techno Trousers in Nick Park's animated short Wallace & Gromit in The Wrong Trousers (1994)
 "SID 6.7", the villain in the film Virtuosity (1995) as a nanotech synthetic android, played by Russell Crowe
 David, Becker and Jessica from Screamers (1995) based on the short story "Second Variety" by Philip K. Dick
 Project 2501 in the movie adaptation of Masamune Shirow's Ghost in the Shell – Japanese manga anime describes AI surveillance of the population (1995)
 Evolver, villain from the 1995 film
 Solo (1996), based on Robert Mason's 1989 novel Weapon 
 Call in Alien Resurrection (1997)
 The seductive Fembot assassins in Austin Powers: International Man of Mystery (1997) and in the rest of the Austin Powers series; in Austin Powers: The Spy Who Shagged Me (1999), it's revealed that the character Vanessa Kensington was a fembot, and in Austin Powers in Goldmember (2002), Britney Spears plays herself as one.
 Weebo in Flubber (1997)
 "Robot" in Lost in Space (1998), a movie based on the TV series
 Astor, an android played by Stacey Williams in Gangster World (1998)
 The Iron Giant (1999), a film version of the Ted Hughes children's novel The Iron Man Andrew, played by Robin Williams and others, the robot servant in The Bicentennial Man (1999), based on a short story by Isaac Asimov
 The Sentinels from The Matrix (1999)
 Battle Droids from Star Wars: Episode I – The Phantom Menace to Star Wars: Episode III – Revenge of the Sith RoboGadget in Inspector Gadget (1999)
 Bender Bending Rodríguez (Bending Unit 22) a.k.a. Bender from the Futurama TV series and direct to DVD movies

2000s
 AMEE (Autonomous Mapping Exploration and Evasion), the robot scout in the film Red Planet (2000) who gets stuck in military mode and destroys the human crew of the spaceship
 Goddard, Jimmy Neutron's robot pet dog in Jimmy Neutron: Boy Genius (2001)
 Tima, a female android robot in the anime film Metropolis (2001)
 SIMON, from Lara Croft: Tomb Raider (2001)
 Many robots, including David, the lead character, in A.I. Artificial Intelligence (2001); based on the "Supertoys" of Brian Aldiss' short story "Supertoys Last All Summer Long"
 Kay-Em 14, female android in the tenth installment of the Friday the 13th franchise, Jason X (2002)
 Spyder robots, used by the PreCrime police force to locate and identify "perpetrators" in Minority Report (2002)
 Bruno from The Adventures of Pluto Nash (2002)
 S1M0NE (derived from SIMulation ONE), title character played by Rachel Roberts and starring Al Pacino (2002)
 Bio-Electronic Navigator a.k.a. B.E.N., an absent-minded robot from Disney's 2002 film Treasure Planet B-4, Data's and Lore's older brother in Star Trek: Nemesis (2002)
 US 47 in the 2002 Kannada language film Hollywood R4-P17 and the Droid Army in Star Wars: Episode II – Attack of the Clones (2002) and Star Wars: Episode III – Revenge of the Sith (2005)
 Arnold Schwarzenegger as the T-850 Terminator and Kristanna Loken as the T-X Terminatrix in Terminator 3: Rise of the Machines (2003)
 G2 from Inspector Gadget 2 (2003)
 The robot butler B166ER and the residents of the machine nation of Zero-One in the film shorts "The Second Renaissance Part I" and "The Second Renaissance Part II" from The Animatrix (2003)
 The Sentinels from the Matrix series (1999–2003)
 The robot from Zathura: A Space Adventure (2005)
 The "dolls", including Ria, in Natural City (2003)
 R.A.L.P.H. in Spy Kids 2: The Island of Lost Dreams (2002)
 Sonny (Type NS-5) and many others in I, Robot (2004)
 Omnidroid, a series of intelligent and destructive robots developed by Syndrome to fight and kill "Supers" in The Incredibles (2004)
 The monstrous robot dog in Rottweiler (2004)
 The great spirit Mata Nui, god robot from the Bionicle franchise; and the Vahki, the robot police enforcers in Bionicle 2: Legends of Metru Nui (2004)
 The Totenkopf Gatekeeper Robot, Totenkopf Guard Robots, unnamed giant robots and flying robots in Sky Captain and the World of Tomorrow (film) (2004)
 The entire cast of Robots (2005)
 Marvin the Paranoid Android in The Hitchhiker's Guide to the Galaxy (2005)
 "EDI" (Extreme Deep Invader") from Stealth (2005)
 Transmorphers, title characters from the 2007 direct-to-DVD movie
 DOR-15 and Carl in Meet the Robinsons (2007)
 Iron Avengers from Next Avengers: Heroes of Tomorrow (2007)
 Billybot and Mandroid from the 2007 Cartoon Network original movie, Billy and Mandy's Big Boogey Adventure.
 Giddy from Battle for Terra (2007)
 RoboDoc (MD 63) from the 2008 National Lampoon film of the same name
 WALL-E, EVE, M-O, GO-4, SECUR-T, PR-T, BURN-E, WALL-A and all other robot characters from the 2008 film WALL-E and the 2008 short BURN-E Gort, the robot in the film The Day the Earth Stood Still (2008), remake of The Day the Earth Stood Still (1951)
 "The Golden Army", robot horde from Hellboy II: The Golden Army (2008)
 The robot ninjas from Scooby-Doo! and the Samurai Sword (2008)
 Astro Boy and other robot characters from the 2009 film of the same name
 Several characters in Terminator Salvation (2009) including Marcus Wright, the T-800, several T-600's, The Motor-Terminators and The Harvester
 GERTY 3000 from the 2009 film Moon The Stitchpunks and others from the animated film 9 (2009)
 Robo from Super Capers (2009)

2010s
 Android, Robot gladiator in Planet Hulk (2010)
 Brainbots, Megamind's robotic jellyfish assistants in Megamind (2010)
 Chitti, a humanoid robot played by Rajinikanth, built to obey the three laws of Asimov, turns evil in Enthiran (2010)
 Paws, Kitty Galore's robotic Maine Coon in Cats & Dogs: The Revenge of Kitty Galore (2010)
 Candy Droober, Franklin Droober, Maureen Droober and Trace Mayter in Android Re-Enactment (2011)
 Atom, and Many characters from the film Real Steel (2011)
 Max, a robotic butler played by Lluís Homar, Gris, a free-thinking robotic cat, tiny robot horses and SI-9 in Eva (2011)
 '80s Robot in The Muppets (2011)
 Robot 7, from All-Star Superman (2011)
 David 8 and Walter One, androids played by Michael Fassbender in Prometheus (2012) and Alien: Covenant (2017)
 Tet, a tetrahedron in Earth's orbit that enslaved the human population, and cloned workers to maintain drones that keep humans from using the generators in Oblivion (2013)
 MecWilly, in the pub scene in the Italian film  (2013)
 Jaegers, man-made, 250-ft war machines built to fight giant monsters called kaiju, who emerge from a portal in the Pacific Ocean to attack humanity, in Pacific Rim (2013)
 Dr. Wallace Damon, chief of a research group of investigation about UFOs from The Signal (2014)
 Sheriff Not-a-Robot, a robotic sheriff from the Old West and the Micro Managers, Lord Business' henchmen in The Lego Movie (2014)
 Baymax, an inflatable healthcare companion robot in Big Hero 6 (2014)
 TARS and CASE, adaptable rectangle robots in Interstellar (2014)
 Ultron, an evil android portrayed by James Spader, and the Vision, a synthezoid portrayed by Paul Bettany, in Avengers: Age of Ultron (2015)
 Ava, the android in Ex Machina (2015)
 Athena, the audio-animatronic droid recruiter in Tomorrowland (2015)
 Intergalactic Advocate Bob, the assistance android that guides Jupiter Jones through the bureaucratic process in Jupiter Ascending (2015)
 T-800, the robot protector in Terminator Genisys (2015)
 CHAPPiE, the first robot with the ability to think and feel for himself, from the movie of the same name (2015)
 MOOSE and the Scouts in CHAPPiE Rob-Monkey, Gorilla Grodd's minions from Lego DC Comics Super Heroes: Justice League: Attack of the Legion of Doom (2015)
 BB-8, an astromech droid in Star Wars: The Force Awakens (2015)
 Arthur, an android bartender portrayed by Michael Sheen in Passengers (2016)
 Kit, Okra, OX King, Victor and Wilmer in Bling (2016)
 K-2SO, a Rebel-owned Imperial enforcer droid in Rogue One: A Star Wars Story (2016)
Morgan, a female humanoid from Morgan (2016)
 S.A.R.-003, During the battle, Mills discovers an advanced S.A.R. (Study Analyze Reprogram), in Kill Command (2016)
 Bennie and Jet, robot dogs in Kingsman: The Golden Circle (2017)
 K, Luv, Freysa, Sapper Morton and Mariette, replicants in Blade Runner 2049 (2017)
 A.X.L., a robotic dog in A.X.L. (2018)
 Cybots and the Robo-Clowns, The Joker's minions from Lego DC Comics Super Heroes: The Flash (2018)
 Nimani in A.I. Rising (2018)
 L3-37, played by Phoebe Waller-Bridge in Solo: A Star Wars Story (2018)
 Alita, an amnesiac cyborg girl who is guided by cyborg scientist Dr. Dyson Ido to learn about her destiny, while fighting alongside or against other Hunter-Warriors in Alita: Battle Angel (2019)
 Chucky, killer robot doll in Child's Play (2019)
 Foodio, a robot built to end world hunger in Invader Zim: Enter the Florpus (2019)

 2020s 
 Sox, a robotic cat from Pixar's Lightyear (2022)
 M3GAN , an android companion created for the main character of the film M3GAN (2023)

Television films and series

1960s and earlier
 Mechano, the robotic cat programmed to kill or banish mice from houses, from the 1952 episode, "Push-Button Kitty" of Tom and Jerry.
 Adventures of Superman (1952–1958), "The Runaway Robot" episode (1953).
 In The Thin Man (1957–1959):
 Robby (Robby the Robot), a robot accused of murder in the episode "Robot Client" (1958)
 In The Twilight Zone (1961–1962):
 Alicia, an android in the episode "The Lonely" (1959)
 Jana, an android, played by Inger Stevens, who is unaware that she is a robot, in "The Lateness of the Hour" (1960)
 The electrical grandmother in the episode "I Sing the Body Electric" (1962)
 Allen, a robot who falls in love with a human girl in the episode "In His Image" (1962)
 The Robot Simon (Robby the Robot) in the episode "Uncle Simon" (1963)
 Mr. Whipple's robot replacement (Robby the Robot) in the episode "The Brain Center at Whipple's" (1963)
 Andromeda in A for Andromeda (1961)
 In Supercar (1961–1962):
 The Robot Servants of Professor Watkins in the episode "The Lost City" (1961)
 Rosie the Maid, Mac and UniBlab in The Jetsons (1962)
 In Hazel (1961–1966):
 A robot maid (Robby the Robot) in the episode "Rosie's Contract" (1962)
 In Fireball XL5 (1962–1963):
 Robert, the transparent auto-pilot robot invented by Professor Matic
 The Granatoid Robots in the episode "The Granatoid Tanks" (1963)
 The Robots of Robotvia in the episode "Trial By Robot" (1963)
 Various unnamed robots in Space Patrol (1963–1964) (US title: Planet Patrol)
 In The Outer Limits (1963–64)
 Trent, an android from the far future in the episode "Demon with a Glass Hand" (1964)
 Adam Link, a robot accused of the murder of his creator in the episode "I, Robot" (1964)
 In Doctor Who (Seasons One to Six) (1963–1969) (see also List of Doctor Who robots):
 The Ice Soldiers in the serial The Keys of Marinus (1964)
 The Mechonoids, robot enemies of the Daleks in the serial The Chase (1965)
 A robot double of the Doctor created by the Daleks in the serial The Chase (1965)
 The Chumblies in the serial Galaxy 4 (1965)
 The War Machines in the serial The War Machines (1966)
 The Yeti in the serials The Abominable Snowmen (1967) and The Web of Fear (1968)
 The Servo Robot in the serial The Wheel in Space (1968)
 The Quarks in the serial The Dominators (1968)
 The White Robots and the Clockwork Soldiers in the serial The Mind Robber (1968)
 In Thunderbirds (1965–1966):
 Braman, a robot invented by Brains seen in the episodes "Sun Probe" (1965), "Edge of Impact" (1965) and "The Cham-Cham" (1966)
 The plutonium store Security Robots in the episode "30 Minutes After Noon" (1965)
 Astro Boy in the Japanese animated series (1963–1966)
 Rhoda Miller (a.k.a. AF709) in My Living Doll (1964), a fembot played by Julie Newmar
 Gigantor (1963–1966), Japanese animated TV series about the giant titular robot.
 In The Avengers (1965–1969):
 The Cybernauts in the episodes "The Cybernauts" (1965) and "Return of the Cybernauts" (1967)
 Robot duplicates in the episode "Never, Never Say Die" (1967)
 Tobor, the android in the Japanese anime series 8 Man (1965) and his older, stronger but less sophisticated sister Samantha 7
 The Deep Space Probe in "The Indestructible Man" (1965) episode of Voyage to the Bottom of the Sea (1964–1968)
 Giant Toy Robot in "The Fun-Fun Killer" (1966) episode of Honey West (1965–1966)
 In Lost in Space (1965–1968):
 Robot B-9 (a.k.a. The Robot), Class M-3 General Utility Non-Theorizing Environmental Control Robot assigned to the space craft Jupiter 2 The Robotoid (Robby the Robot) in the episode "War of the Robots" (1966)
 Verda, a gynoid in the episodes "The Android Machine" (1966) and "Revolt of the Androids" (1967)
 Raddion, a male android in the episode "The Dream Monster" (1966)
 The IDAK Super Androids in the episode "Revolt of the Androids" (1967)
 The Industro Mini Robots in the episode "The Mechanical Men" (1967)
 The robot prison guard (Robby the Robot) in the episode "Condemned of Space" (1967)
 The Xenian Androids in the episode "Kidnapped in Space" (1967)
 The Female Robot and Mechanical Men in the episode "Deadliest of the Species" (1967)
 The Junkman in the episode "Junkyard in Space" (1968)
 In Ultra Seven (1967–68):
Windom, one of the three capsule monsters used by Ultraseven
King Joe in the episode "Ultra Garrison Goes West, Part 1"
Zero One, a human female looking android in the episode "Android Zero Directive"
Crazygon, a robot designed by an alien race to steal cars.
 In Get Smart (1965–1970):
 Hymie the Robot, a robot originally created by KAOS an organization of evil, but turned to the side of good and niceness by CONTROL agent Maxwell Smart; first appeared in episode 19, "Back to the Old Drawing Board"
 In Gilligan's Island:
 The Government test robot in the episode "Gilligan's Living Doll" (1966)
 In Frankenstein Jr. and The Impossibles Frankenstein Jr
 In The Addams Family (1964–1966):
 Smiley the Robot (Robby the Robot) in the episode "Lurch's Little Helper" (1966)
 In Star Trek (1966–1969):
 Dr. Roger Korby, Andrea, Dr. Brown, Ruk and the Kirk android in the episode "What Are Little Girls Made Of?" (1966)
 Nomad, a sentient robot probe in the episode "The Changeling" (1967)
 The Norman, Alice, Herman, Barbara, Maizie, Annabelle and Trudy series androids and the Stella Mudd androids in the episode "I, Mudd" (1967)
 Rayna Kapec in the episode "Requiem for Methuselah" (1969)
 The android replicas of Mr. Atoz in the episode "All Our Yesterdays" (1969)
 Serendipity Dog, a robot dog who asks questions on the BBC children's science series Tom Tom (1966–1969)
 Robot "driver" of the race car Melange / X3 in the Speed Racer episodes "Revenge of Marengo (Part one)" and "(Part two)" / "Race for Revenge: Part 1" and "Part 2" (1967)
 Giant Robo/Flying Robot and others in the series Johnny Sokko and His Flying Robot (1967–1968)
 In Captain Scarlet and the Mysterons (1967–1968):
 The Mysteron construction robots in the episode "Crater 101" (1968)
 Mildred the Maid (Robby the Robot) in The Banana Splits Adventure Hour (1968–1970)
 In Joe 90 (1968–1969):
 The Spider riot control robots in the episode "The Professional" (1969)
 In Land of the Giants (1968–1970):
 Professor Gorn's Super Giant Robot, a giant android, in the episode "The Mechanical Man" (1969)
 Slim John, rebel robot in the BBC series (1969)

1970s
 Robot dog Dynomutt in animated series Dynomutt, Dog Wonder Zed, the rebel robot in The Ed and Zed Show
 In Doctor Who (Seasons 7 to 17) (1970–1980):
 The IMC Mining Robot in the serial Colony in Space (1971)
 The Sontaran Knight Robot in the serial The Time Warrior (1973–1974)
 The K1 Robot invented by Professor Kettlewell in the serial Robot (1974–1975)
 The Sontaran Surveillance Robot in the serial The Sontaran Experiment (1975)
 The Osirian Service Robots, mummy-like robot servants of Sutekh in the serial Pyramids of Mars (1975)
 The Kraal Androids, including android duplicates of the Doctor, Harry Sullivan and RSM Benton, in the serial The Android Invasion (1975)
 Dum, Voc and Supervoc robots in the serial The Robots of Death (1977)
 K9, the Doctor's robot dog companion with encyclopaedic knowledge and vast computer intelligence, created by Professor Marius and introduced in the serial The Invisible Enemy (1977)
 The Seers of the Oracle in the serial Underworld (1978)
 K9 MkII, the second version of the Doctor's robot dog companion, introduced in the serial The Ribos Operation (1978)
 The Polyphase Avatron, the Captain's robot parrot in the serial The Pirate Planet (1978)
 The Taran Androids, including an android duplicate of Romana, in the serial The Androids of Tara (1978)
 The Movellans, android enemies of the Daleks, in the serial Destiny of the Daleks (1979)
 Numerous android characters in the Japanese superhero series Kikaider (1972), including the title character
 S.A.M. (Super Automated Machine) the "perfect machine" robot in Sesame Street (1969–present), introduced in episode 0406 (1972)
 In Here Come the Double Deckers! (1971):
 Robbie, a dancing robot invented by Brains in the episode "Robbie the Robot" (1971)
 In Columbo (1971–1993):
 MM7 (Robby the Robot) in the episode "Mind Over Mayhem" (1974)
 In Robbi, Tobbi und das Fliewatüüt, a German television series for children (1972):
 Robbi a.k.a. ROB 344–66/IIIa, co-pilot of the Fliewatüüt and student of a third class at robot school (1972)
 In Kolchak: The Night Stalker (1972–1975):
 "Mr. R.I.N.G." (Robomatic Internalized Nerve Ganglia), a top secret military robot in the episode of the same name (1975)
 In The Six Million Dollar Man (1973–1978):
 A robot double of Major Fred Sloane in the episode "Day of the Robot" (1974)
 A robot double of Oscar Goldman in the episode "Return of the Robot Maker" (1975)
 Sasquatch, the robot watchdog of marooned aliens in the episodes "The Secret of Bigfoot – Part 1" (1976), "The Secret of Bigfoot – Part 2" (1976), "The Return of Bigfoot – Part 1" (1976) and "Bigfoot V" (1977)
 The Fembots and a robot double of Oscar Goldman in the episode "Kill Oscar – Part II" (1976)
 Death Probe, a Soviet Venusian robot probe in the episodes "Death Probe – Part 1" (1977), "Death Probe – Part 2" (1977), "Return of the Death Probe – Part 1" (1978) and "Return of the Death Probe – Part 2" (1978)
 Questor in The Questor Tapes (1974)
 In Space: 1999 (1975–1977):
 The Servant of the Guardian in the episode "Guardian of Piri" (1975)
 Gwent, a sentient spaceship in the episode "The Infernal Machine" (1976)
 Zarl, Zamara and the other Vegan androids in the episode "One Moment of Humanity" (1976)
 Brian the Brain in the episode "Brian the Brain" (1976)
 A robot double of Maya in the episode "The Taybor" (1976)
 The Cloud Creature in the episode "The Beta Cloud" (1976)
 Fi and Fum, the time-travelling androids from the children's series The Lost Saucer (1975–1976)
 In The New Avengers (1976–1977):
 A Cybernaut in the episode "The Last of the Cybernauts...??" (1976)
 In Ark II (1976):
 Alfie the Robot (Robby the Robot) in the episode "The Robot" (1976)
 In The Bionic Woman (1976–1978):
 Sasquatch, the robot watchdog of marooned aliens in the episode "The Return of Bigfoot – Part 2" (1976)
 The Fembots in the episodes "Kill Oscar" (1976), "Kill Oscar – Part III" (1976), "Fembots in Las Vegas – Part 1" (1977) and "Fembots in Las Vegas – Part 2" (1977)
 Yo-Yo, a.k.a. Geogory Yoyonovitch in Holmes & Yo-Yo (1976)
 Officer Haven in Future Cop (1976–77)
 In The Fantastic Journey (1977):
 Cyrus, Rachel, Daniel, Michael and the other android members of Jonathan Willoway's community in the episode "Beyond the Mountain" (1977)
 In Logan's Run (1977–78):
 REM, a male android who joins Logan and Jessica in their search for Sanctuary
 Draco, a male android, and Siri, a gynoid, in the pilot TV movie (1977)
 Friend and Nanny, Lisa's robot companions in the episode "The Innocent" (1977)
 Ariana, a gynoid, in the episode "Futurepast" (1978)
 The Clinkers in Shields and Yarnell (1977–78)
 Peepo, the robot in the children's series Space Academy (1977–1979)
 In Space Sentinels (1977):
 MO (Maintenance Operator), Sentinel One's maintenance robot
 Haro in Mobile Suit Gundam (1979)
 Voltes V of the Japanese animated series Chōdenji Machine Voltes V (1977)
 P.O.P.S. (Robot B-9 modified) in Mystery Island (1977–78)
 7-Zark-7 and 1-Rover-1 in the animated series Battle of the Planets (1978)
 In Battlestar Galactica (1978–1979):
 The Cylons, mechanical men created by a race of reptile-like creatures
 Muffit Two, a robot daggit who becomes Boxey's pet
 Lucifer, an IL series Cylon, the robot assistant to Count Baltar introduced in "Saga of a Star World – Part III" (1978)
 Specter, an I-L series Cylon, the garrison commander on Antilla in the episode "The Young Lords" (1978)
 Hector and Vector in the episode "Greetings from Earth" (1979)
 IQ-9 in Star Blazers (1978–1984), originally called "Analyzer" in Space Battleship Yamato (1974–1980)
 H.E.R.B.I.E. (Humanoid Experimental Robot, B-type, Integrated Electronics) in the 1978 Fantastic Four animated series
 Blake's 7 (1978–81) featured several robots and androids.
 In The New Adventures of Wonder Woman (1977–1979):
 Dr. Solano's swordmaster robot in the pilot movie "The Return of Wonder Woman" (1977)
 Orlick Hoffman's android duplicates of Dr. Tobias, Dr. Prescott, Dr. Lazaar and Wonder Woman in the episode "The Deadly Toys" (1977)
 Rover, the IADC's robot dog, Cori, William Havitol's robot secretary, and Havitol's evil duplicate of Rover in the episode "IRAC is Missing" (1978)
 In Quark (1977–1978):
 Andy the Robot, a cowardly robot built by Adam Quark from spare parts
 In Mork & Mindy (1978–1982):
 Chuck the Robot (Robby the Robot) in the episode "Dr. Morkenstein" (1979)
 In Salvage 1 (1979):
 Mermadon, a junked government-constructed android in the episode "Mermadon" (1979)
 In Buck Rogers in the 25th Century (First Season) (1979–1980):
 Twiki, Buck's ambuquad robot who wears Dr. Theopolis, a brilliant talking computer, around his neck
 Tina, a golden ambuquad that Twiki falls in love with in the episode "Cruise Ship to the Stars"
 Humanoid robot security guards in the episode "Unchained Woman"
 W1k1 (or Wiki), the pocket-sized robot in the children's series Jason of Star Command (1979–1981)
 The TV movie Romie-0 and Julie-8 (1979) features two androids who fall in love.

1980s
 Armstrong, a robot in DuckTales (1987)
 Robot 67 Bright 2, a robot who appears in two episodes of a week in Mister Rogers' Neighborhood in 1983
 Metal Mickey, the Wilberforces' household robot in Metal Mickey (1980–1983)
 In Buck Rogers in the 25th Century (Second Season) (1981):
 Twiki, Buck's ambuquad robot, and Crichton, a robot created by Dr Goodfellow
 In Doctor Who (Seasons Eighteen to Twenty-Six) (1980–1989):
 The Gundan War Robots in the serial Warriors' Gate (1981)
 The Urbankan Androids in the serial Four to Doomsday (1982)
 The Terileptil Android in the serial The Visitation (1982)
 The Cybermen's Androids in the serial Earthshock (1982)
 Kamelion, a shape-changing android introduced in the serial The King's Demons (1983)
 K9 MkIII, Sarah Jane Smith's robot dog companion, in the episode The Five Doctors (1983)
 The Raston Warrior Robot in the episode The Five Doctors (1983)
 The Daleks' Androids, including android duplicates of the Doctor, Tegan and Turlough, in the serial Resurrection of the Daleks (1984)
 The Androzani Androids created by Sharaz Jek, including android duplicates of the Doctor and Peri in the serial The Caves of Androzani (1984)
 The Karfelan Android in the serial Timelash (1985)
 Drathro and the L1 robot in the serial The Trial of a Time Lord (1986)
 Driller, in the series ThunderCats (1985)
 Berbils, robot bears of the animated kids TV show ThunderCats (1985-1987)
 Sillycone, the butler of the animated kids TV show The Bluffers (1986)
 The Robotic Cleaners in the serial Paradise Towers (1987)
 The Kandy Man, a robot made from sweets (candy) in the serial The Happiness Patrol (1988)
 The Bus Conductor and the Robot Clowns in the serial The Greatest Show in the Galaxy (1988–1989)
 KARR ('Knight Automated Roving Robot), an early prototype of KITT in Knight Rider (1982–1986)
 In Terrahawks (1983–1986):
 Zelda, Yung-Star, Cy-Star and It-Star, evil androids from the planet Guk
 Sergeant Major Zero, Space Sergeant 101, Dix-Huit and many other Zeroids, spherical battle robots
 Dr. Kiljoy, Zeroid robot doctor in the episodes "The Ugliest Monster of All" (1983), "Zero's Finest Hour" (1984) and "Operation Zero" (1986)
 Roboz, the orange robot invented by Murray 'Boz' Bozinsky in Riptide (1984–1986)
 The B.A.T.s (Battle Android Trooper) of the evil Cobra Organization in G.I. Joe: A Real American Hero series, first appeared in 1986
 The GoBots of Challenge of the GoBots (1984–1985)
 The Transformers of various Transformers television series (1984–present)
 Voltron of Voltron: Defender of the Universe (1984–1986)
 Roboto from Masters of the Universe (1984)
 The Orbots—Tor, Bort, Bo, Boo, Crunch, and Ohno from Mighty Orbots (1984)
 An enemy Bioroid pilot was described by a scientist in the Masters story (1985) of the Robotech science fiction series as a very advanced android with some sort of bio-electric device "as an artificial soul." Robotech adapted this story from Super Dimension Cavalry Southern Cross Japanese animated series (1984), in which these pilots are humans with mechanical implants instead of androids with artificial souls.
 The synthoids from several episodes of the G.I. Joe: A Real American Hero series (1985)
 V.I.C.I. (Voice Input Child Indenticant), the 10-year-old android built by Ted Lawson on Small Wonder (1985)
 Vanessa from Small Wonder Buzzwang, an android customised as a galaxy ranger on The Adventures of the Galaxy Rangers (1986)
 Tobor, the Shadow-double of Mighty Orbots from the episode "Devil's Asteroid" (1986)
 Robo Story, French cartoon with various robots in its main cast
 Conky 2000, robot who gives out the secret word in Pee-wee's Playhouse (1986–1991)
 T-Bob, a droid developed and owned by Scott Trakker, from the animated television series M.A.S.K., closely resembling R2-D2, and perhaps even a direct successor as an adapted Tx-series Industrial Automaton astromech droid, as implied by the show's storyline.
 The Robot Masters from the Mega Man series (1987)
 In Bionic Six (1987–1989)
 F.L.U.F.F.I., the Bionic Six's pet/family-member gorilla-bot and Dr. Scarab's Cyphrons
 Material for the Robotech II: The Sentinels (1987) and Robotech: The Shadow Chronicles (2007) sequels described a character named Janice Em as a "sexy robot" with an "android body." JANICE is an acronym (according to the voice actress Chase Masterson in the video: The Face behind the Voice mini-documentary) which means: Junctioned Artificial Neuro-Integrated Cybernetic Entity.
 Lil Bulb, robot with a light bulb for head, created by Gyro Gearloose on DuckTales (1987-1989)
 There were many robots featured in Teenage Mutant Ninja Turtles, including the Foot Soldier ninjas, Metalhead the robotic turtle, MACC the cowboy robot from the future, the Turtle Terminator, REX-1 the robot cop, Chrome Dome, the Pretendicon, and more.
 Data, Lore, Lal (Data's daughter) and Juliana Tainer in the series Star Trek: The Next Generation (1987–1994, plus four movies)
 Steed, a robotic horse ridden by Saber Rider in the animated series Saber Rider and the Star Sheriffs (1987–1988)
 Chip Carson from the Not Quite Human series (1987, 1989, 1992)
 Tom Servo, Crow T. Robot, Gypsy and Cambot, created by and friends to Joel Hodgson and later Mike Nelson from Mystery Science Theater 3000 (1988)
 Talkie Toaster, Kryten, the Skutters, the Simulants and many others from the series Red Dwarf (1988)
 Blitz, a robotic dog from the cartoon C.O.P.S. (1988–1989)
 Roberta from Not Quite Human II (1989)
 No-No from the animated children's series Ulysses 31 Blinky from the animated children's series Bucky O'Hare ASTAR, a golden robot promoting safe play to children
 Robin, a small robot made by the clown Bassie in the children's series Bassie en Adriaan Yulgis from Dirty Pair: Affair on Nolandia Kevin, a robot created by Screech Powers on Saved by the Bell (1989–1993)

1990s
 Autonomous telepathic tentacles, Dr. Octopus' robot from Spider-Man D.E.C.K.S., a talking robot with a VHS tape for a head, from the 1991 Disney Channel series Jump, Rattle, and Roll, formerly Wake, Rattle, and Roll (1990)
 Captain Planet from Captain Planet and the Planeteers Sgt. Eve Edison, robot police officer in Mann & Machine (1992)
 The Exocomps, small sentient artificial lifeforms that can perform a variety of tasks from the Star Trek: The Next Generation episode "The Quality of Life"
 Alpha and Omega from the TV series The Flash (1990–1991) – Alpha, a government constructed female android (gynoid) assassin that develops a conscience, determines that killing is wrong, and wishes to be free from government control. Omega is a government-built android assassin reprogrammed to find Alpha
 Giant Robo and others from Giant Robo: The Animation (1992–1998)
Robot Princess: A robot clone of Princess Peach from the Super Mario series featured in the 1990 cartoon, The Adventures of Super Mario Bros. 3, based on Shigeru Miyamoto's 1990 game of the same name, Super Mario Bros. 3 The Bots Master, a syndicated animated series about a young inventor named Ziv "ZZ" Zulander with robot friends and inventions, such as the B.O.Y.Z.Z. (Brain Operated Young Zygoetopic Zoids). Along with his younger sister, they fight the Robotic Megafact Corporation and its line of 3A robots. (1993)
 Rexor from RoboCop: Alpha Commando Ringer from the episode "The Replacements" of the Space Rangers TV series, a prototype android being tested as a Ranger replacement (1993)
 Alpha 5 from Mighty Morphin Power Rangers (1993–1996) to Power Rangers Turbo Handi-Driod from In Living Color Megazords, giant robots from Power Rangers franchise (1993–present)
 Machine Empire from Power Rangers Zeo to Power Rangers in Space Battle Borgs from Mighty Morphin Alien Rangers (1995)
 Alpha 6 from Power Rangers Turbo to Power Rangers Lost Galaxy and Power Rangers Operation Overdrive The many Evangelions, or EVAs, from the Neon Genesis Evangelion series
 THELMA (Techno Human EmuLating MAchine) from Space Cases (1996)
 790, the sarcastic and perverse bodyless robot head of Lexx Blue Senturion, robotic Intergalactic Police Officer from Power Rangers Turbo to Power Rangers in Space A number of robots appear in Buffy the Vampire Slayer, including:
 Moloch, a dæmon trapped in a robotic body, from "I, Robot... You, Jane" (S1 E8, 28 April 1997)
 Ted Buchanon, a robot, made in the 1950s by a sickly inventor also named Ted Buchanan, who marries women resembling the wife of his maker, from "Ted" (S2 E11, 8 December 1997)
 April, a sexbot made by and for Warren Mears in "I Was Made to Love You" (S5 E15, 20 February 2001)
 Buffybot, a sexbot made by Warren Mears for Spike, appears in various episodes, including
 "Intervention" (S5 E18, 24 April 2001)
 "The Gift" (S5 E22, 22 May 2001)
 "Bargaining" parts one and two (S6 E1&2, 2 October 2001)
 Warrenbot, a robotic duplicate that Warren Mears made of himself, from "Villains" (S6 E22, 14 May 2002)
 Bender the robot, as well as Flexo, Robot Santa, Kwanzaa-Bot, Calculon, Robot Devil, Clamps and other assorted robots including the Epsilon Rho Rho fraternity robots in the animated series Futurama (1999)
 Melfina from Outlaw Star Tinky Winky, Dipsy, Laa-Laa, Po, the Noo-Noo, the Tubby Toaster, the Tubby Custard Machine, the Tubby Sponge Cases, the Tubby Phone, the Tubby Table, the Tubby Seats and the Tubby Beds from Teletubbies Psycho Rangers from Power Rangers Quantrons from Power Rangers in Space The marionettes from the anime series Saber Marionette R (1995), Saber Marionette J (1997), Saber Marionette J Again (1998), and Saber Marionette J to X (1999)
 Ratbots from Sonic the Hedgehog Robotic Richard Simmons from The Simpsons Rusty, the boy robot of the animated series The Big Guy and Rusty the Boy Robot Andromon and Guardromon in the Digimon anime series
 Satan's Robot, a meta-fictional robot in The Adventures of Captain Proton, a holodeck program from Star Trek: Voyager Coconuts and Scratch and Grounder from Adventures of Sonic the Hedgehog Slo-Mo from Space Precinct Steel/Iron Clan, Coyote, Coldfire/Coldstone from Gargoyles Stealthbots  from Sonic the Hedgehog and Sonic Underground Techbots from Sonic the Hedgehog 
 Torch from Adventures of Sonic the Hedgehog Zords, giant fighting machines from all seasons of Power Rangers series
 Ian Favre, CPB officer in Total Recall 2070 Multi (HMX-12), and Serio (HMX-13) are experimental humanoid maid robots from the anime To Heart. 
 Zero, the service robot in Earth 2 Beetleborg AVs (Attack Vehicles) and Gargantis the Attack Mobile Carrier in Big Bad Beetleborgs Beetleborg BVs (Battle Vehicles), Roboborg and Boron in Beetleborgs Metallix VR Troopertron in the second season of VR Troopers Ken in The Tomorrow Man (1996), sent into the past to save its Inventor and prevent a missile disaster
 Robocrook in the PBS game show Where in the World is Carmen Sandiego? Paperboy 2000, the paper delivering robot vehicle from the sitcom series Get a Life Azaka and Kamidake, robot Jurai Guardians who serve and protect Jurai Princess Ayeka, Yukinojo, the robot pilot for Mihoshi's space shuttle, and Zero, an android replicant of the space pirate Ryoko, are the most notable robots in the Tenchi Muyo! TV series.
 Mac and Molly Mange, two criminals turned robot by Professor Hackle in the animated series SWAT Kats: The Radical Squadron Valerie 23 and Mary 25 from The Outer LimitsSpongetron, a robot double of SpongeBob SquarePants in the future
Janperson, a purple android from Japanese Metal Heroes Series Tokusou Robo Janperson2000s
Alpha 7 from Power Rangers Wild Force (2002)
Andromeda, (a.k.a Drommie) the android "avatar" of the artificial intelligence operating the warship of the same name in Andromeda (2000-2005)
Ant Drones, Flying Termites, Beetle Drones and various other robots from the Samurai Jack series (2001–2004)
Back-Pack, Gears' main partner from the series Static Shock. It is a semi-independent, sophisticated AI robot that acts as a scouting robot, a computer, machine hacker, code breaker, alarm system, police scanner, tracer, weapons unit and restraining device. Back-Pack gets its name from what it resembles when it "heels", with the body being the bag and its legs the backpack straps. Back-Pack is rather significant because he can link up to Gear's thoughts, giving Gear technopathy (2000–2004)
The Black Widows from Totally Spies! 
Bebes from Kim PossibleBocoe, Decoe, and Bokkun from Sonic XBrenda from The Simpsons C.H.E.E.S.E., a backronym for Computerized Humanoid Electronically Enhanced Secret Enforcer, is the main character of a fictional crime/adventure science-fiction television show which aired from Season 6 to Season 7 of Friends.
Cher from Totally Spies! Undercove 
Chim-Chim from Speed Racer: The Next Generation Chitron 6, a robot from Samurai Jack (2003)
 Cleatus, a robot and the mascot of Fox NFL Sunday as well as all of Fox Sports
 Reg, a robot bath toy from Rubbadubbers (2002)
Chii, the Persocom in the Japanese anime series Chobits (2002)
Cybernetic Ghost of Christmas Past from the Future, Rabbot, Robositter and Sheila from Aqua Teen Hunger Force (2000–2015)
Daggermouth, a sophisticated talking fish robot designed and built by an old seaman with no engineering background, from Family GuyDaigunder in the Japanese anime series (2002)
Dark Heart from Justice League Unlimited
David from The SimpsonsDestructo Bots from Legion of Super HeroesFrax and the Cyclobots from Power Rangers Time Force (2001)
Funnybot from South ParkFufu, robot dog, from Totally Spies! Undercover 
Ghost Robot from The Venture Bros.GIR and the Robo-Parents from Invader Zim (2001)
Goddard, Jimmy Neutron's robot pet dog in The Adventures of Jimmy Neutron: Boy Genius (2002–2006)
Guard-Bots from Buzz Lightyear of Star CommandJ from the Japanese anime series Heat Guy J (2002–2003)
Kurumi and the rest of the steel angels from Steel Angel Kurumi (1999–2001)
Lawrence "Larry" 3000 from Time Squad (2001–2003)
Linguo from The SimpsonsThe Machine from Celebrity DeathmatchMahoro, the protagonist of Mahoromatic (2001–2003)
Mecha-Streisand from South ParkMechanic World from Animal Mechanicals (2007)
Mr Dent, nanotech enforcer from Code Name: Eternity (2000)
Quincy from Mary-Kate and Ashley in Action! (2001)
Ralph-O-Cop from The Simpsons (2004)
Robot Bill Cosby from South ParkRobot Jones, Mom Unit and Dad Unit from Whatever Happened to Robot Jones? (2002)
Robot Miley Cyrus from Family GuyRo-Boy from The Venture Bros.Rockbot 3000 from Totally Spies! UndercoverRommie, Gabriel/Balance of Judgement, Pax Magelanic, Doyle and various other warship AIs/avatars from Gene Roddenberry's Andromeda (2001–2005)
SARA from Toonami (2000–)
Satan's Robot, usually in service for Dr. Chaotica but impressionable enough to sometimes work for good, in episodes of Star Trek: Voyager (1995–2001) when the holodeck program "Captain Proton" is run
 Simon, a humanoid robot with the mind scanned from a dead little boy with AI technology, from The Outer Limits episode "Simon Says" (2000)
 Spydroids from Totally Spies! Undercover (2005)
 Skyler, Tyler, and Wyler from Totally Spies Undercover! (2006)
Thundercleese from The Brak Show (2001–2003)
 XR (eXperimental Ranger); XL, the proto-version of XR; NOS-4-A2; and Zurg's robots from Buzz Lightyear of Star Command (2000–2001)
Zeta from the TV show The Zeta Project (2001–2002)
 From Kim Possible (2002–2007):
 Diablo
 Oliver
 Flamingo of Doom
 Wadebot
 Ol Tornado, a robot horse
 Destructo-Bots
 Nano Tick
 Princess, a robot car 
 Stockbots
 Synthodrones
 From Toonami:
 TOM 1
 TOM 2
 TOM 3
 TOM 4
 TOM 3.5
 TOM 5
 TOM 6
 "Jenny" XJ-9 Wakeman and her sisters, also Melody, Kenny, Vega and various robotic villains from My Life as a Teenage Robot (2003)
 R. Dorothy Wayneright in The Big O (2003)
 Tinabob from Bob's Burgers Zeo Zagart from Beyblade (2003)
 Jack Spicer's army of Jack-bots, including robots of himself and other people in Xiaolin Showdown (2003–2006)
 From Teenage Mutant Ninja Turtles (2003–2009):
 Karaibots
 TurtleBot
 Nano
 H.E.L.P.eR. (Humanoid Electric Lab Partner Rboot), G.U.A.R.D.O. and Huggy in The Venture Bros. (2003–present)
 The Tachikoma spider tanks from Ghost in the Shell: Stand Alone Complex (2004–2005)
 C.A.R.R from Stroker and Hoop (2004–2005)
 D.A.V.E. (Digitally Advanced Villain Emulator) from The Batman (2004–2008)
 Cylons from Battlestar Galactica (2004)
 Centurions
 Hybrids
 Number One (John Cavil)
 Number Two (Leoben Conoy)
 Number Three (D'anna Biers)
 Number Four (Simon)
 Number Five (Aaron Doral)
 Number Six (Caprica Six et al.)
 Number Seven (Daniel)
 Number Eight (Sharon Valerii et al.)
 The Final Five:
 Galen Tyrol
 Tory Foster
 Samuel Anders
 Saul Tigh
 Ellen Tigh
 Rachael from Viewtiful Joe (2004–2005)
 Megas and T-Bot from Megas XLR (2004–2005)
 Jinmay from Super Robot Monkey Team Hyperforce Go! (2004–2006)
 Miyu Greer from the anime series My-HiME (2004–2005) and My-Otome (2005–2006)
 X-5, B-1 and Robo-Betty from Atomic Betty (2004–2008)
 The Replicators, seen in multiple seasons of Stargate SG-1 (1997–2007) and Stargate Atlantis (2004–2009)
 The Humping Robot from Robot Chicken (2005–present)
 Gunslinger from Trinity Blood (2005)
 Krybots, R.I.C. 2.0 (Robotic Interactive Canine) and S.O.P.H.I.E. (Series One Processor Hyper Intelligent Encriptor) from Power Rangers S.P.D. (2005)
 Anne Droid, Trin-E, Zu-Zana and Davinadroid from the Doctor Who episode "Bad Wolf" (2005)
HMX-17a Ilfa, HMX-17b Milfa, and HMX-17c Shilfa are experimental maid robots from To Heart 2 (2005–2006).
 Robotboy (2005–2008)
From Ben 10 (2005–2008):
 The Mechadrones and Galvanic Mechomorphs
Slix Vigma
S.A.M, weather-controlling robot
 From American Dad! (2005–present):
 Robot Matthew McConaughey
 Robot Johnny Depp
 The construction drones and destruction drones, in Johnny Test (2005–2014)
 Fallbot from Danger Rangers (2006)
 The Loganator from Zoey 101 (2006)
 Lucia von Bardas from Fantastic Four: World's Greatest Heroes (2006–2007)
 Constable Biggles from Teenage Mutant Ninja Turtles: Fast Forward (2006–2007)
 Brainiac 5 in Legion of Super Heroes (2006–2008)
 Woodbot and Rockbot from The Emperor's New School (2006–2008)
 Tama, Ms. Otose's android maid from the anime Gin Tama (2006–2010)
 GR: Giant Robo (2007)
 Mackenzie Hartford from Power Rangers Operation Overdrive (2007)
 Serling and Viral from Teenage Mutant Ninja Turtles: Fast Forward (2007)
 From Tengen Toppa Gurren Lagann (2007)
 Gurren Lagann
 Arc Gurren Lagann
 Super Galaxy Gurren Lagann
 Tengen Toppa Gurren Lagann 
 Super Tengen Toppa Gurren Lagann, the largest mecha in anime measuring 52.8 billion light years tall according to the official guide book from GAINAX (仕事魂); after transforming into a drill its length is multiplied 10 times
 Yui, Takaya's android maid from Koharu Biyori (2007–2008)
 Tieria Erde, Ribbons Almark, Regene Regetta and the other Innovators from the anime Mobile Suit Gundam 00 (2007–2009)
 Jailbot from Superjail! (2007–2014)
 Norm, a squirrel-powered robot owned by Doofenshmirtz in Phineas and Ferb (2007–2015)
 Plex  from Yo Gabba Gabba! (2007–present)
 The Interrodroids from The Middleman (2008)
 Cameron from Terminator: The Sarah Connor Chronicles (2008–2009)
 Cyber Shredder from TMNT: Back to the Sewer (2008–2010)
 Robot Krabs from SpongeBob SquarePants  Ship from Ben 10: Alien Force (2008–2010)
  S.T.A.N in Aaron Stone (2009)
 General Crunch, General Shifter, Tenaya 7 and Grinders from Power Rangers RPM (2009)
 Stan from Aaron Stone (2009–2010)
 Trash Bots from Transformers: Animated (2007-2009)
 Robot Race Bannon from Harvey Birdman: Attorney at Law (2010)

2010s
Anita and other Synths from HumansAnti-Trump Pundit 3000 from The Greg Gutfeld Show AIDA from Marvel's Agents of S.H.I.E.L.D. Albearto from Rise of the Teenage Mutant Ninja Turtles Alpha-Red from Batman: the Brave and the Bold Andrew from I Am Frankie Athena from Kim Possible Anti-Fire Bot from Sonic Boom April O'Neil Sex Bot 3000 from Robot Chicken Argus from Power Rangers Super Megaforce Arisa from Better than Us Ash from the Black Mirror episode "Be Right Back" (11 February 2013)
 Assisdroid from Moonbeam City Attacbots from Marvel's Avengers Secret Wars Barry-6 from Archer: 1999 Bee from Bee and  PuppyCat Benny Gallagher from Emergence Berserkers from Randy Cunningham: 9th Grade Ninja Beto from I Am Frankie Bionobots from Kong: King of the Apes Black Lion from Voltron Force Blip from Bolts and Blip Blitz Botz from NFL Rush Zone: Season of the Guardians Blue Lion from Voltron Force Bob from I Am Frankie (2017)
 Bobert from The Amazing World of Gumball Bolts from Bolts and Blip B.O.Y.D. and B.U.D.D.Y.  from DuckTales Brainbot from Ultimate Spider-Man Buddy Guard and Buddy Guardians from Big Hero 6: The Series Burn Bot and Buster from Sonic Boom Butler from Red Dwarf Series XI 
 Buzzcams from Power Rangers Ninja Steel Cashina from SpongeBob SquarePants Camera Bots from Iron Man: Armored Adventures Carl from Final Space Cherry Tomato from Rise of the Teenage Mutant Ninja Turtles Chip from Man Seeking Woman Coach Gridiron from Bolts and Blip Clevetron from The Cleveland Show Conductor Bot from Ben 10 Conroy from Rick and Morty Cosbytron 5000 from Saturday Night Live Cowpokes from Randy Cunningham: 9th Grade Ninja Crushroom from Big Hero 6: The Series Cybot from Lego DC Comics Super Heroes: Justice League: Attack of the Legion of Doom CY.T.R.O. from Max Steel Darkhawks from Guardians of the Galaxy Darklops Zero and Darklops from Ultra Galaxy Legend Side Story: Ultraman Zero vs. Darklops Zero (2010)
 De-Construction Droid from Inspector Gadget Derek Fisher from Legends of Chamberlain Heights Destructo from The Thundermans Destructo-Bot from Randy Cunningham: 9th Grade Ninja Diamond Dogs from The Venture Bros. The Disciplinarian from Randy Cunningham: 9th Grade Ninja Dither from Transformers: Rescue Bots Douglas from American Dad! Dorian, the MX-43s, and others in Almost Human (2013)
 Doris from Aqua TV Show Show Dreddnaughts from Max Steel Dropkick from NFL Rush Zone DT-87 from DuckTales Dudy from K.C. Undercover Ethan Woods from Extant Evil Lazer from Major Lazer Evil Robot Axe Cop from Axe Cop Fister Roboto from Archer Footbot from  Gravity Falls Footbots from  Teenage Mutant Ninja Turtles Fox-bots from Power Rangers Super Ninja Steel Frankie from I Am Frankie (2017)
 Franky from One Piece Franz Nukid from Randy Cunningham: 9th Grade Ninja Freda from Aqua TV Show Show Funbeak from Archer: 1999 Furbo from Max Steel Future Frond from Bob's Burgers Galactron from Ultraman Orb (2016)
 Gay Robot from Nick Swardson's Pretend Time Giant Robot Greymatter from Ben 10 Glad-One from Infinity Train Guardbots from Avengers Assemble Green Lion from Voltron Force Gregory from Kirby Buckets Grinder, Grindette, and Grindertron from Pac-Man and the Ghostly Adventures Guardians of the Status Quo from Teen Titans Go! Hangry Panda from Big Hero 6: The Series Hank from Final Space HUE from Final Space Heistotron and Randotron from Rick and Morty Henry Fondle from BoJack Horseman The Hive Queen from Marvel's Avengers Secret Wars Hot Robor from Saturday Night Live Hunger-bot from Randy Cunningham: 9th Grade Ninja Hurt Bot from Teen Titans Go! Hyper-Potamus from Big Hero 6: The Series Hypnobot from Sonic Boom
 IDBot from Randy Cunningham: 9th Grade Ninja
 Interrobot from Moonbeam City
 Irmabots from 2012 Teenage Mutant Ninja Turtles
 Isaac from The Orville. Science Officer aboard the U.S.S. Orville, is of the Kaylon race. He's an artificial life form packed with knowledge.
 Isaacs from Black Dynamite
 Isla and other Giftias from Plastic Memories. Giftias are androids that appear and behave nearly identical to humans, even with convincing emotions; however, they have a definite and short lifespan (less than ten years), causing problems for the humans who have established emotional entanglements with them.
 J-Borg from Power Rangers Dino Fury
 JBot from The Venture Bros. Jack Hammer from Randy Cunningham: 9th Grade Ninja
 Jean-Bot from Ultraman Zero: The Revenge of Belial
 Jean-Nine from Ultraman Saga Side Story: Ultraman Zero Gaiden: Killer the Beatstar (2011)
 Jimmy the Robot of The Aquabats from The Aquabats! Super Show!
 Judy from K.C. Undercover
 K-10 from South Park
 K-Pop from Major Lazer
 KIT-9 from South Park
 Kitty Ko of Sidekick
 KOK-A-3 from South Park
 Kraken from Ultimate Spider-Man
 Krieger from Archer: 1999
 Krieger Bots from Archer
 Krackenstein from Randy Cunningham: 9th Grade Ninja
 Kudobots from Power Rangers Ninja Steel
 KVN from Final Space
 Lance from Randy Cunningham: 9th Grade Ninja
 Laserbots from Randy Cunningham: 9th Grade Ninja
 Leaderbots from Hulk and the Agents of S.M.A.S.H.
 Lucas from Extant
 Lucy from Extant
 The Law from Major Lazer
 Lyle from Family Guy
 Mandroids from Iron Man: Armored Adventures
 Marauder Bots from Randy Cunningham: 9th Grade Ninja
 Marcus Davenport from Lab Rats
 Markov from Miraculous: Tales of Ladybug & Cat Noir
 Matt Barnes from Legends of Chamberlain Heights
 Maxum Brain of Sidekick
 Mechanoids from Ben 10
 Mecha Gomora from Ultra Galaxy Legend Side Story: Ultraman Zero vs. Darklops Zero (2010)
 Medbot from The Simpsons
 Mega from Sonic Boom
 Megabot from Ultimate Spider-Man
 Mega-Gecko from All Hail King Julien
 Mega-Yama from Big Hero 6: The Series
 Mega Skullbots from Marvel's Avengers: Secret Wars
 MeGo from Game Shakers
 Meka-Zorn from Son of Zorn
 The Messenger from Power Rangers Megaforce
 Metal Alice from Power Rangers Megaforce 
 Milton from Archer
 Mindroid from Ninjago: Masters of Spinjitzu
 Mini-Max from Big Hero 6: The Series
 Molly X from Extant
 Mom-Bot from All Hail King Julien: Exiled
 MorBot from Transformers: Rescue Bots
 Mr. E from Masters of Spinjitzu
 Mr. Logic from OK K.O.! Let's Be Heroes
 Nanny bots from Ultimate Spider-Man
 N.E.P.T.R. from Adventure Time
 Nindroids from Ninjago: Masters of Spinjitzu
 Ninjabot from Randy Cunningham: 9th Grade Ninja
 Nod-Bot from The Simpsons
 Noodles from Final Space
 Noodle Burger Boy from Big Hero 6: The Series
 Obliterator Bot from Sonic Boom
 Octus from Sym-Bionic Titan
 One-One from Infinity Train
 Orson from Final Space
 Otto  from Randy Cunningham: 9th Grade Ninja
 Pain Bot from Teen Titans Go!
 Party-bot from Golan the Insatiable
 PEGS1 from I Am Frankie
 RoboPerry from Lab Rats
 Pacifista, models PX-0, Bartholomew Kuma, PX-1 to PX-Z from One Piece
 Prankzooka from Randy Cunningham: 9th Grade Ninja
 President Pepperoni from Rise of the Teenage Mutant Ninja Turtles
 Principal Howard from Mighty Med
 Private Beats from Randy Cunningham: 9th Grade Ninja
 Proto Bat-Bot from Batman: The Brave and the Bold
 Psycho-Bot from Randy Cunningham: 9th Grade Ninja
 Q-Drones from Transformers: Rescue Bots
 Radbot from Agents of S.H.I.E.L.D.
 Redbot from Power Rangers Ninja Steel
 Red Lion from Voltron ForceReg from Made in Abyss
 Rhinosaurus from Randy Cunningham: 9th Grade Ninja
 Richard from Extant
 Richie' from Kong: King of the Apes
 Rico from Power Rangers Megaforce 
 Robert the Robot from Justin's House
 Robbie from American Dad!
 Roba from The Problem Solverz
 RoboBo from The Venture Bros. Robo-Cyclops from Randy Cunningham: 9th Grade Ninja
 RoBro from Massive Monster Mayhem
 Robeasts from Voltron Force
 Robo-Apes from Randy Cunningham: 9th Grade Ninja
 Robo-Baby from Transformers: Rescue Bots
 Robo-Dog from PAW Patrol (2014)
 Robo-Frog from Randy Cunningham: 9th Grade Ninja
 Robo Hooligans from Randy Cunningham: 9th Grade Ninja
 Robo Knight from Power Rangers Megaforce (2013)
 Robo-Lawyer from Jimmy Kimmel Live!
 Robo-Panther from Ben 10 (2016 TV series)
 Robo-Penguins from Lego DC Comics: Batman Be-Leaguered 
 Robo-Raptors from Half-Shell Heroes: Blast to the Past
 Robo-Roaches from I Am Frankie
 Robo-Sharks from Lego DC Comics: Batman Be-Leaguered 
 Robo-Spinosaurus from Half-Shell Heroes: Blast to the Past
 Robo-Usher 3000 from Lego Ninjago: Masters of Spinjitzu
 Robo-Vengers from The Avengers: Earth's Mightiest Heroes
 Robot from R. L. Stine's The Haunting Hour: The Series episode "My Robot" (S3E23, 30 November 2013).
 Robot Brian from Family Guy
 Rotox  from Power Rangers Megaforce
 Rotox DX from Power Rangers Megaforce
 R.U.R. 9500, name for Ruru Amour / Cure Amour from Hugtto! PreCure
 Sad-One from Infinity Train
 Saedee from Bolts and Blip
 Sasha from Jeff & Some Aliens
 Scare-a-Dactyls from Randy Cunningham: 9th Grade Ninja
 Scaramouche from Samurai Jack
 Scrapmaster from Transformers: Rescue Bots
 Scrubber bot from Transformers: Rescue Bots
 Secretarabot 2500 from TripTank
 Sex Robot from The Whitest Kids U' Know
 Shot Bot from Power Rangers Super Ninja Steel
 Simone from I Am Frankie
 Skullbots from Marvel's Avengers: Secret Wars
 Sky-Max from Big Hero 6: The Series
 Snacky from Red Dwarf XI
 Space Mice from Voltron Force
 Spider Killer 3000 from Spider-Man
 Steam Accelerate from Ben 10
 Steam Cannonbolt from Ben 10
 Steve from Bolts and Blip
 Steven Universe, Garnet, Amethyst, Pearl and other Gems from Steven Universe
 Steward from Infinity Train
 Ballot Stuffer Bot from Sonic Boom
 TAALR from Extant
 T-1, T-2, and T-3 from Lucas Bros. Moving Co.
 Team Barefoot – the GGO footballers from the Chinese animation AI Football GGO (2010)
 Ted-A from Family Guy
 Ted-R from Family Guy
 Tensou from Power Rangers Megaforce
 T.E.R.R.Y. from Dream Corp, LLC
 The Android from Dark Matter 
 Thorax the Thunder Wasp from TripTank
 Thrasher, Blastus and others from Robotomy
 THX-1138 from Robot Chicken: Star Wars Episode III
 Tigrr Jaxxon from Bolts and Blip
 Timely Corporation Security Drone from Guardians of the Galaxy
 Toilet Cop from Teen Titans Go!
 Totbot 3000 from Legends of Chamberlain Heights
 Tough Luck Chuck from Transformers: Rescue Bots Academy
 Trex from Transformers: Rescue Bots 
 Trina from Big Hero 6: The Series
 Troy West from Lab Rats: Bionic Island
 Uncanny from Miraculous World: New York – United HeroeZ
 Validate from Moonbeam City
 VX3 Warbots from Teenage Mutant Ninja Turtles
 Wafflebot from A Very Harold & Kumar 3D Christmas
 The War Drone from Teen Titans Go!
 Water Rotox  from Power Rangers Megaforce
 Weatherheads from Ben 10
 Welder from Bolts and Blip
 Wi-Fido from Transformers: Rescue Bots
 Wrench from Power Rangers Dino Charge
 XBorgs from Power Rangers Super Megaforce
 Yellow Lion from Voltron Force
 Yo-Tomatic from Blazing Team: Masters of Yo Kwon Do
 Yuko from Unbreakable Kimmy Schmidt
 Zane and P.I.X.A.L. from Ninjago: Masters of Spinjitzu
 Various androids called "hosts" in the HBO series Westworld (2016–), based on the 1973 film of the same name

Comics

Comic books/graphic novels

American

 The Mad Thinker's Awesome Android in Fantastic Four and various other Marvel Comics; later featured in the She Hulk 2004 series under the name "Awesome Andy"
 Biotron from Micronauts
 Clickers from Top 10
 Coheed (the Beast), Cambria (The Knowledge), Jesse (The Inferno), Mayo Deftinwolf, and a number of other IRO-Bot "children", who are genetically altered humans with superhuman powers and robotic qualities (i.e., can be taken apart and terminated), from the graphic novel series The Amory Wars written by Coheed and Cambria frontman Claudio Sanchez. The characters and plotlines are also incorporated into the band's music.
 Computo, created by Brainiac 5
 Doctor Doom's Doombots in Fantastic Four (1961)
 Dreadnoughts in Marvel Comics
 Fugitoid in Teenage Mutant Ninja Turtles
 G.I. Robot, a construct used by the U.S. Marines in World War II, which appeared in Weird War Tales
 Volt from Chaz comic Grag and Otho from the pulp magazines Captain Future and Startling Stories
 The Human Torch in Marvel Comics (1939)
 Jeremy Feeple and Professor Steamhead were replaced with badly constructed, unconvincing robot doubles (which eventually exploded) in an early issue of Ninja High School.
 Lady Ada in Ghost Rider 2099
 The Little Helper by Carl Barks, Gyro Gearloose's small robot assistant in Disney comics (1956). Also called Little Bulbhead in Barks' notes, leading to his name of Little Bulb in DuckTales.
 The Living Brain from Spider-Man comics
 L-10, a robotic lion and assistant to T'Challa.
 Mechano Monster from Journey into Mystery comics
 Robin the Toy Wonder from Young Justice comics
 Zenyatta, Mondatta,Lynx Seventeen, and others from Overwatch
 Manmachine, from the Manmachine epic
 Machine Man a.k.a. Aaron Stack from Marvel Comics
 Machine Teen from Marvel Comics
 The Manhunters in Green Lantern
 Irona, the robot maid of Richie Rich, the main character in a comic book and cartoon series (1961)
 The Mekka Men, the female android Mimi, and an android Mickey Mouse lookalike, all created by Pegleg Pete's inventor prisoner Professor Numbspiegel in the Disney comic strip "Mickey Mouse and the World of Tomorrow" by Floyd Gottfredson and Bill Walsh (1944)
 The Metal Men, a band of 6 robots, each of a different metal element, created to fight a nuclear menace, from DC's Showcase #37 (1962)
 Microtron from Micronauts
 Mousers in Teenage Mutant Ninja Turtles
 Nanotron from Micronauts
 Octobots from The Amazing Spider-Man
 Peabody from Zot!. Zot's robot butler/guardian.
 Robinbot from DC comics. A member of the Justice League of China.
 The Red Tornado, Amazo, Tomorrow Woman and Hourman III in JLA (1968)
 Robotman from the series that would evolve and be renamed Monty by Jim Meddick (1985) – Robotman was eventually written out of the story entirely. 
 Doctor Ivo Robotnik from the Archie Sonic the Hedgehog comic book
 The robots in the comic book Magnus, Robot Fighter, including:
 1A, the oldest sentient robot, protector of mankind, who raised Magnus
 H8, the robot police chief, who plots against mankind
 Roboduck from the NEW-GEN comic book series
 Scud: The Disposable Assassin from the comic series and accompanying games
 The Sentinels in X-Men (1963)
 Skeets, Booster Golds robot companion from Booster Gold
 The Spider-Slayers from the Spider-Man comics
 The Superman duplicates, Brainiac (pre-Crisis) and Kelex in Superman (1958)
 Ultron, the Vision, Jocasta and Alkhema in The Avengers (1963)
 Young Vision, a member of the Young Avengers, a rebooted new version of the Vision
 Victor Mancha, an android created by Ultron in Marvel Comics
 Transmetropolitan features AIs who abuse virtual hallucinogens
 Technovore from Iron Man
 Android from Frank Miller's Hard Boiled
 Ida from The Middle Man
 C-Gram the android bartender from Marvel Comics' Ghost Rider 2099 series
 L-Ron, from the DC Comics series Justice League International
 Atomic Robo Tesla, eponymous hero of Atomic Robo published by Red 5 Comics
 Wildebots from Incredible Hulk

Australian
 Mr. Pendulum from Ben Templesmith's Wormwood: Gentleman Corpse

British
 The ABC Warriors from the comic 2000 AD, includes Hammerstein Android Andy, a parody of Robot Archie in Captain Britain
 Armoured Gideon from 2000 AD
 Brassneck in The Dandy
 Elektrobots in Reign of the Robots, a Dan Dare story from the Eagle comic (1957)
 Mechanismo, a range of robo-Judges from Judge Dredd
 Robo Machines Robot Archie in the UK comic Valiant who has appeared in Zenith and Albion
 Ro-Busters, a 2000 AD series
 Walter the Wobot robotic servant to Judge Dredd also from 2000 AD

Franco-Belgian
 Unnamed robot by Hergé from first adventure of Belgian series Jo, Zette et Jocko (1936)
 Otomox, the self-proclaimed "Robot Master" by André Mavimus (writer) and Roger Roux (artist) (1943)
 Radar le robot by André Franquin from Belgian series Spirou et Fantasio (1947)
 Madame Adolphine by Peyo, an evil android in the guise of a harmless grandma, from the Belgian series Benoît Brisefer (1963)
 La Schtroumpfette (Smurfette) by Peyo, a golem in the guise of a female smurf, from Belgian series Les Schtroumpfs (1966)
 Exploding robots in the shape of guard dogs, in the episode "Pâtée explosive" from Belgian series Gil Jourdan by Maurice Tillieux (1969)
 Cyanure by Tome and Janry, an evil sexy female android from Spirou et Fantasio (1983)
 Robo-cops from Incal (by Moebius and Jodorowsky)

Other European
 The domestico elettrodomestico, one of the more striking robots in Disney comics, looking like a clown, from the comic "Zio Paperone e il domestico elettrodomestico" by Guido Martina and Giuseppe Perego (1967)
 Robbie, a recurring robot constructed by inventor Knox in German series Fix und Foxi, first drawn by Massimo Fecchi (1976)
 Robots from the planet Des from the Polish series Bogowie z kosmosu (Gods from the Space), written by Arnold Mostowicz and Alfred Górny and illustrated by Bogusław Polch (1978)
 RanXerox, a mechanical creature made from Xerox photocopier parts, by Italian artists Stefano Tamburini and Tanino Liberatore; first appeared in 1978, in Italian, in the magazine Cannibale
 Uèr, an "electro-chemical" android capable of human feelings, in the Italian comic book Milady 3000 by Magnus (1980)
 Link is an android in a team of human agents in the Italian comics series Agenzia Alfa, published by Sergio Bonelli (1997–present; Nathan Never and Legs Weaver are on the same team, although having series of their own). Link's name could be a tribute to Adam Link. His look has some similarity to Star Treks Data in an alternate timeline, except for a silver strip of hair on top of his head.

South American
 The Stellar Warriors from Karmatron  by Oscar González Loyo (1986)
 Tonto and Lothar from The Metabarons (1992–2003)

Manga (Japanese comics)
 Giant Robo in the manga by Mitsuteru Yokoyama (1967–1968)
 Doraemon in the manga of the same name by Fujiko Fujio (1969)
 Chihiro and Robita plus various other robots from Osamu Tezuka's Phoenix (1971)
 Arale Norimaki, the main character of Dr. Slump; also Obotchaman (1980-1984)
 Marilyn, named after Marilyn Monroe, in Kazuo Umezu's 1982 manga My Name is Shingo
 Sergeant Metallic, Android 8, Android 16, Android 17, Android 18, and Android 19, all created by Dr. Gero (Android 20) from Dragon Ball (1984–1995)
 Banpei and Sigel in Oh My Goddess! by Kōsuke Fujishima (1988–present)
 Project 2501 in Masamune Shirow's Ghost in the Shell, a Japanese manga that describes an espionage AI that achieves sentience (1991)
 Alpha Hatsuseno, Kokone Takatsu, Maruko Maruko, Director Alpha Koumiishi (female robots) and Nai (a male robot) in the manga series Yokohama Kaidashi Kikou by Hitoshi Ashinano in Kodansha's monthly seinen magazine Afternoon (1994–2006)
 Rin Asakura, Bathyscaphe and other robots, cyborgs and space vessels that look like humans in The World of Narue by Tomohiro Marukawa (1999–2012)
 Chi and other Persocoms from the manga Chobits (2001–2002)
 Chachamaru Karakuri, plus other robots in the manga Negima by Ken Akamatsu (2003–2012)
 Tres Iques from Trinity Blood by Sunao Yoshida (2004–present)
 Flandre, Flanders and Francesca from the anime Princess Resurrection (2005–2013)
 Nano Shinonome and Biscuit #1 and #2 from Nichijou by Keiichi Arawi (2006–present)
 Mira Yurizaki from Dimension W by Yūji Iwahara (2011–present)
 Villain Bots  from My Hero Academia by Kōhei Horikoshi (2016–present)
 Astro Boy  (original name: Mighty Atom) in the manga of the original name by Osamu Tezuka (1952-1968)

Comic strips
 Awbry  from the comic strip Nancy
 Beetle Bot from the comic strip Beetle Bailey
 Bossbot, a robot created by Dilbert
 Kollege Blech from the comic strips of East German caricaturist Erich Schmitt (1965)
 Robotman (1985) in the comic strip of the same name, which eventually became "Monty". Robotman left the strip and found happiness with his girlfriend Robota on another planet.
 A heroic female robot called Mimi, an evil robot doppelganger of Mickey Mouse, and a robot army led by Peg-Leg Pete in the newspaper strip The World of Tomorrow (1944) by Floyd Gottfredson and Bill WalshRubert, a robot created by DilbertTickle-Bot 3000 from the comic strip ThatababyThe Vacunator from the comic strip Pooch CafeRobot Cartoons Cartoon catalog featuring the work of Dan Rosandich

Web comics
 Anima: Age of the Robots (Anima) is an 18-chapter webcomic series depicting robots taking over the fictional planet of Anima, homeworld of talking animals.
 "Clanks", various (steam powered?) robots in Phil Foglio's steampunk fantasy Girl Genius
 Eve, a female android from Applegeeks, built using Apple Macintosh parts
 Emotibot, a robot programmed to feel emotions, from Beaver and Steve
 Evil Killer Death Spybot 5000 from Mark Shallow's Adventurers!, a robot originally designed to spy on the party, who eventually becomes a playable character
 Ezekiel a.k.a. "Zeke", formerly known as the "X-bot", the anthropomorphised Xbox console from the webcomic Ctrl+Alt+Del
 Fruit Fucker, a semi-sentient kitchen appliance in the webcomic Penny Arcade that has sex with fruit and ejaculates the juice
 Carl Swangee, a sentient android from the Penny Arcade 'Automata' storyline
 J-LB8/Jalea Bates in Melonpool, started as a robot, later became a human
 Kleptobot, a supposedly Soviet-made robot programmed to steal anything and everything, from Joe and Monkey
 Medivac 911 ("Doc"), a steam-powered medical/janitorial droid from Polymer City Chronicles
 The Ottobot, a robot duplicate of the character Francis Ray Ottoman featured in PvP
 PC, ASCII and O in Funny Farm
 Ping, the PlayStation 2 accessory robot-girl from Fred Gallagher's Megatokyo
 Pintsize, an AnthroPC from Questionable Content; also other AnthroPCs 
 Stevebot 07 from 8-Bit Theater
 Various characters from Homestuck by Andrew Hussie
 Various characters from Diesel Sweeties, including Clango Cyclotron

Web-based media
 Stella 4D, a.k.a. Manager 45, on GO Moonbase; first appears in episode 26

Animated shorts/series
 Jewbot/Robobot from SuperMansion
 Deathbots from SuperMansion

Flash
 Rya Botkins and June Crane of Matt Wilson's Bonus Stage (though Crane's status is disputed, as she has claimed to be human)
 The Robot, a contestant in the Strongest Man in the World Contest, from Homestar Runner.
 The Visor Robot, a futuristic robot with a visor, from Homestar Runner
 The Grape-Nuts Robot, created by Bubs to imitate Strong Bad from Homestar Runner
 Schniz, Fulker, CPDoom, and various background characters from Andrew Kauervane's My God, Robots!

Web series
 Penny Polendina, a sentient android from the Rooster Teeth web series RWBY
 Robo Fizz, from Helluva Boss
 Bot Best Friend, a commercially sold robot with five different "friendship modes" from the Smosh video Awesome New Robot!
 Tari, an amnesiac cyborg girl from Meta Runner

Machinima
 Lopez, Church and Tex, characters from the Rooster Teeth machinima Red vs. Blue. Only Lopez is a true artificial life-form, as both Church and Tex existed only as ghosts ( later in the series through solid proof showed that they both are AI programs like O'Malley the whole time ). Both characters were blown up during the course of the series, existing from that point onward in robot bodies other than their originals. They possess mechanical bodies similar to Lopez in design.

Podcasts
 Little Button Puss, character from Episode #310 of the Comedy Bang! Bang! podcast, played by John Gemberling. Little Button Puss, a.k.a. HPDP69-B, is a promotional robot built by Hewlett-Packard and is the first ever robot created with a fully sentient artificial intelligence, personality, and speaking function. It was designed by HP engineers for the express purpose of sexually pleasing humans. Comedy Bang! Bang! host Scott Aukerman was sent Little Button Puss as part of a promotional advertising campaign for the line of sex-robots. Little Button Puss looks like a metal dog, and has small flesh patches where its genitals are. Elsewhere, it's described as having the appearance of "nickel blue, gun metal". It is verified in the episode that Scott Aukerman lustily removed Little Button Puss's retractable genitals, threw them in a trash can, and then proceeded to use the HPDP69-B for its intended purpose. Afterwards, according to Comedy Bang! Bang! official canon, Aukerman looked back on the incident with shame. A complaint about the HPDP69-B is that for a sex-robot, "it looks too much like a metal dog". In a brief look into its past, Little Button Puss recounts an old romantic relationship with its long lost love, United Flight 93, who "died in the September 11th attacks".
The Co-Host 3000 (later Sidekick 3000), character from the Spill and Double Toasted podcasts, voiced by Tony Guerrero.
NO-3113 (Pronounced "Noelle"), a "hug-sized" robot in the Dungeons & Dragons podcast The Adventure Zone, created by Clinton, Justin, Travis, and Griffin McElroy. She is a robot created by the scientist Lucas Miller. She is described as looking pieced together from assorted parts with the sequence "NO-3113" written on her side. She floats above the ground and is able to administer healing shots. Later, she upgrades her body into a gorilla-like robot with four arms. It is later revealed that she is a ghost inhabiting the body of robot and was Lucas' first trial in retrieving a human soul from the Astral Plane and putting it inside a fusebox. Her original identity was Noelle Redcheek - a red-haired halfling girl part of a cider-brewing family business.

Computer and video games

 Blade Wolf, Raiden's robotic wolf companion from Metal Gear Rising: Revengeance (2013)
 Mech, Skull from Captain America and The Avengers (1991)
 Star Dream, from Kirby: Planet Robobot
 Warbots, secbots, kittybots and pupbots from Void Bastards
Zero Beat, an antagonist from Jet Set Radio Future
Dr. Samuel Hayden, Doom (2016) and Doom Eternal
Connor, Markus and Kara among many others from Detroit: Become Human
Yes Man, a friendly robotic sycophant from Fallout: New Vegas
Adjutant, an adviser and announcer from Starcraft and Heroes of the Storm
Bastion, Orisa, Zenyatta, Tekhartha Mondatta and various omnics from Overwatch
 Various robot from Metal Arms: Glitch in the System
 Blitzcrank from League of Legends
 Bouncer, Wind-Up, Jawbreaker, Ro-Bow, Gearshift, Drill Sergeant, Magna Charge, and High Volt from the Skylanders series
Mecha Gruntilda from the 2003 Game Boy Advance platformer developed by Rare (company), Banjo-Kazooie: Grunty's Revenge which is noted for being the first Banjo-Kazooie game made by Rare under Microsoft instead of Nintendo.
 Various robot fighter from Rise of the Robots and Rise 2: Resurrection
 The Krobots from Donkey Kong 64 (1999).
Evila and the Evila Security Bots, from the Space Channel 5 series
 BT-7274 from Titanfall 2
 Blade Robots from Sphinx and the Cursed Mummy
 CHEFBOT-9000 from Prinny: Can I Really Be the Hero?
 Cephalobot, Sprocket, and Ribbot from the Animal Crossing series (Del is not included, as he is a cyborg).
 Codsworth from Fallout 4
Crunch, from Paragon
 Diver and Drones from Abzû
 Dr Kahl's Robot from Cuphead
 DG a.k.a. Cash Cube a.k.a. ABak from PT Trading
 GLaDOS, from the Portal series
 Astro Bot, from the Astro Bot video game series
Merope, from Master X Master
Pathfinder, Revenant, and Ash from Apex Legends
Probius, from Heroes of the Storm
 Dallas 13, the cyborg from Vigilante 8: 2nd Offense
Chickie Boom, Hans Texas Ranger, and Boomer from DreamWorks Interactive's Boombots
 White Bomber of the Bomberman race from the Bomberman series
 Cowboy Robot monster from 100 Rogues
 Ashlotte, a clockwork girl brought to life and powered by magic in Soulcalibur IV
 Eve, a playable character in Elsword. She is part of a lost robot race called Nasod, accompanied by Moby and Remy to assist her in fighting she is searching for an El Crystal to help her rebuild her race . She is known as the "Queen of the Nasods" and in one of her class changes she creates other robots named Oberon, Ophelia, and Ferdinand.
 King Nasod, code name Adam one of the first Nasod built, a boss in Elsword
 Various Nasod models - there are multiple types of Nasod, each specific to the job it was created for each given names ranging from Leviathan and  Ignis to Nasod TYPE-N and   Nasod TYPE-F; they act as basic mobs or bosses in game.
 Zero, the robotic guide to Rose in Elsword in one of Rose's classes; helps Rose create more robots such as G-0 Battleroid, Mecha Volt MX, Sparrow units, Ex-C Viper, Gale Force, and The G-Core
 Talos (Or SOMA), the player character in The Talos Principle
 Arthur from The Journeyman Project video game series
 LUX TIZER, a Tetujin from The 7th Saga
 B.O.B.
 Many mining and defense robots in the Descent series of games
 Mining robots and combots from Red Faction
 Floyd, the lovable sidekick robot from the Infocom text adventure Planetfall
 Freddy Fazbear, Bonnie, Foxy and Chica from the Five Nights at Freddy's  series; also other animatronics
 The distinct robots in the original Mega Man series, including the main character Mega Man and the Robot Masters
 The Metal Gears from the Metal Gear series
 Mettaton from Undertale; actually a ghost residing inside a robotic body created by the royal scientist Alphys. He is a celebrity in Mt. Ebott, the home of the monsters.
 K1-B0 (nicknamed Keebo) from Danganronpa V3: Killing Harmony
 Monokuma, the main antagonist of the Danganronpa Franchise.
 Snatchers from the cyberpunk visual novel adventure game Snatcher
 Custom Robo
 Robot bosses from Contra III: The Alien Wars
 Diana and Al King from Doraemon 4: In the Moon Kingdom (ドラえもん4 のび太と月の王国)
 Assorted monsters from the Final Fantasy series, including the superboss Omega Weapon
 The Badniks, the E-Series robots, Dr. Eggman Nega, Captain Whisker, Emerl, Metal Sonic, Mecha Sonic, Metal Knuckles, EggRobo, the Shadow Androids, Cubot, and Orbot from the Sonic the Hedgehog series
 Dr Ion and various other robots from God Hand
 Liberty Prime from the 2008 and 2015 post-apocalyptic role-playing games Fallout 3 and Fallout 4
Mechatron from The Movie Monster Game (1986)
 Miss Bloody Rachel from Viewtiful Joe 2 and Viewtiful Joe: Red Hot Rumble
 Monitor Kernel Access / Monika.chr / Monika, from Doki Doki Literature Club!
 The Reploids of the Mega Man X and Mega Man Zero series, and Mega Man ZX, robots with the ability to think, feel, and make their own decisions, along with Mega Man X, the successor to the original Mega Man and the original basis for most Reploid's designs, and Zero, X's partner and the only Reploid not based on X.
 Enemy robots from Robotron: 2084
 Various robot enemies from Fantastic Four
Most members of the Rhythm Rogues, excluding Shadow and Purge, from the Space Channel 5 series
 Shamus
 Cyber Sub-Zero, Cyrax, Sektor and Smoke from the Mortal Kombat series
 The Drones and Mainframe from Gunman Chronicles
 Robo (serial number R-66Y) from Chrono Trigger
 The Cyberdisc and Sectopod species in X-COM: UFO Defense
 Alisa Bosconovitch, Combot, Jacks and NANCY-MI847J from the Tekken series
 Gadget and Gadget Z from Suikoden II and Suikoden III respectively
 Cait Sith, a fortune-telling robotic cat controlled via remote by a man named Reeve Teusti, from Final Fantasy VII. By extension, Cait Sith rides atop a giant, robotic moogle to which Cait Sith relays commands through a megaphone.
 ROB 64 from the Star Fox series, starting with Star Fox 64
 Emeralda, a colony of nanomachines from Xenogears
 The Servbots from Mega Man Legends
 Hengar from Monster Rancher
 Mingy Jongo, a boss from Banjo-Tooie
 Terror Drone and Robot Tank from Command & Conquer: Red Alert 2, and Yuri's Revenge
 HMX-12 Multi and HMX-13 Serio, the popular robot maids from To Heart, as well as their successor, HMX-17a Ilfa from To Heart 2
 The Robo-Kys from the Guilty Gear series
 Ershin from Breath of Fire IV
 The "Machina" from Final Fantasy X and Final Fantasy X-2
 Cortana, 343 Guilty Spark and 2401 Penitent Tangent, from the Halo series
 Clank, Doctor Nefarious, and countless others in the Ratchet & Clank series
 KOS-MOS, MOMO and the Realians from the Xenosaga trilogy
 Kunoichi and Ninja from  The Ninja Warriors, an arcade game starring robot ninjas
 Robocalypse, Nintendo DS game
 Robots from System Shock
 Robot enemies from Viewtiful Joe
Scooter from Alien Storm
Monita from Nintendo Land
 Bolbox, a playable character from two Motor Toon Grand Prix games.
 Thursday, sidekick of Captain Gordon the 37th Defender of Earth (and later itself the 38th Defender of Earth) from Disgaea: Hour of Darkness
 Turtlebot from Teenage Mutant Ninja Turtles
 HK-47 from Star Wars: Knights of the Old Republic, part of the Star Wars expanded universe
 Kurt Zisa, a secret Heartless boss in the American and Final Mix versions of Kingdom Hearts
 The entire Core army in Total Annihilation and its remakes
 The robots in Zero-K
 Eve from Dark Rift
 Numerous robot enemies from SpongeBob SquarePants: Battle for Bikini Bottom
 Geary, a cleanliness-obsessed and evil robot from Crash Nitro Kart
 The Ridepod, a customizable industrial revolution-style robot that Max can ride in dungeons in the RPG Dark Cloud 2
 Dog from Half-Life 2
 Robot enemies from Journey to Silius (Raf World)
 Chibi-Robo, a tiny robot housekeeper that is the main playable character in the game of the same name
 Mike, a "karaoke robot" from WarioWare: Touched!; its creator, Dr. Crygor used him as a janitor
 Rocket in Rocket: Robot on Wheels
 Browny from Contra: Hard Corps
 The Robot boss from Contra: Hard Corps
 Robot enemies from The Incredible Hulk: Ultimate Destruction
 Various robot enemies from Spider-Man: Friend or Foe
 The Copyroid, a robot that allows a Net-Navi to be projected into the real world and interact with it in Mega Man Battle Network 6
 Yumemi Hoshino, a main character in the visual novel Planetarian: The Reverie of a Little Planet
 Medabots
 Many enemies and bosses from Smash TV
 CD-288 from Contra: Legacy of War
 Oscar, an automaton railwayman from Syberia and Syberia II
 Probotector, PAL version of Contra with the human characters replaced with robots
 Quote and Curly Brace, the "soldiers from the surface" in Doukutsu Monogatari
 Several Protoss units from StarCraft are robotic.
 Most GUN units from Sonic the Hedgehog are robots.
 LapTrap from The Learning Company's The ClueFinders series
 R-110 from TimeSplitters: Future Perfect
 Robot Ninja Haggle Man from Retro Game Challenge
 Virtual Woman, who can be programmed with a new personality, appearance, and history
 Sasuke, a clockwork robot ninja in the Ganbare Goemon series
 Goemon Impact, a very big clockwork robot in Ganbare Goemon, modelled after Goemon himself
 Miss Impact, a female counterpart to Goemon Impact that is modelled after Omitsu
 T-elos(Telos), Ziggy, the E.S. units and the Zarathustra system in Xenosaga
 The various classes of Forerunner Sentinels from Halo
 The Jack of All Trades (or Jack) robot from Gears of War
 Big Robot Bill of the computer game The Neverhood
 The W-Numbers of Super Robot Taisen: Original Generation 2
 T.O.B.O.R. and Makoto/Proto-Makoto, robots created by Dr. F. on MySims and MySims Kingdom
 The Fillbots from Rhythm Heaven
 Wheatley from Portal 2
 Machines/Robots from Team Fortress 2  
 Frobot from the eponymous Wii game
 Admiral Razorbeard and the Robo-Pirates from Rayman Series
 Josef from the Machinarium computer game
 DeskBot, BellBot, DoorBot, LiftBot, BarBot and the Maître d' are crucial characters in Douglas Adams' Starship Titanic
 RFS-81, a Savant fighter droid that will join the player after being repaired in Wizardry 8
 Aigis and Metis from Persona 3; also Labrys from Persona 4 Arena
 In Star Ocean: The Second Story, the main antagonists, who call themselves the Ten Wise Men, were androids made more than 4 billion years ago to suppress rebel forces opposing an ancient empire. They were then reprogrammed to destroy the universe after the death of their creator's daughter.
 Harkness or A3-21, an android designed to hunt down other rogue androids, before finally going rogue himself in the 2008 role-playing game Fallout 3. The character is a reference to the 1982 film Blade Runner
 Mr. Handy, utility robots from the Fallout series
 Curie, a Miss Nanny robot from Fallout 4 modified to conduct scientific experiments in secret in Vault-Tec's Vault 81
 Atlas and P-Body, the android player-characters in the co-op mode in Portal 2
 CL4P-TP also referred to as "ClapTrap" from the Borderlands series
 FL4K, a playable character / Vault Hunter from Borderlands 3 as the Beastmaster class. Works with different types of beasts in battle. Self named by shortening a meaningless 512 alphanumeric character name.
Gortys and Loader Bot from Tales from the Borderlands
 D-Tritus and various others from Scrapland
 Various from Z
 EDI  (an artificial intelligence operating an android formerly named Dr. Eva), Harbinger, Sovereign, the Reapers, and the Geth, including Legion, from the Mass Effect series
 Clanker in The Learning Company's Star Flyer series
 The robotic CAST race from the Phantasy Star series
The Servo series of domestic robots from The Sims: Livin' Large, The Sims 2: Open for Business and The Sims 4: Discover University. They make a cameo appearance as a statue within the science facility in The Sims 3, and have been made available in that game by fan creators.
 The Simbot from The Sims 3: Ambitions, a scrap-built ancestor to the Servo units in the other games in the series, as well as the PlumBots, the highly-customisable, highly evolved descendant of Simbots and Servos featured in The Sims 3: Into The Future
 The Sackbots from LittleBigPlanet 2 and LittleBigPlanet Karting
 Turing, a main character of 2064: Read Only Memories
 Working Joes and Industrial Joes from Alien: Isolation
 Ghost, artificially intelligent companion of guardians in the video game Destiny
 Skell, the giant robot mechs from the video game Xenoblade Chronicles X used as tools and weapons
 Mimeosome, human-like robots from Xenoblade Chronicles X; simulate humans while all the humans are in stasis
 Ruukoto, Reimu's maid from Phantasmagoria of Dim. Dream given to her by Yumemi. Does not appear in any other Touhou project games.
 VIVIT, the protagonist of the Seihou Project series.
 Drones from Angry Birds Epic Raiding Party events.
 2B, 9S and A2, the three main protagonists from NieR: Automata are respectively Battle, Scanner, and Attacker model androids within the game, along with almost all NPCs included in the game itself.
 Lone Echo The Main Character, Jack (Or ECHO ONE) is an Android under command of Captain Olivia "Liv" Rhodes onborad the Kronos II Station in space.
 WX-78 from Don't Starve and Don't Starve Together.
Shinatama, the female android liaison to the main protagonist from the game Oni.
 P.E.K.K.A, from Clash of Clans
 Yopple-Bot and No-Bot from Yo-kai Watch 3
 , UH8, m-UH9 and RV2, undersea utility robots in SOMA. Numerous corrupted versions of these are seen in-game, modified by the WAU artificial intelligence.
 Sweet, Cap'n, and K_K from Deltarune
Amy Amania and Roscoe the Space Dog are rumored to be androids, from the Space Channel 5 series.
 P03 from Inscryption
Prophetbot, Protobot, and Row-bot from OneShot
V1, V2, and Swordsmachine from Ultrakill
Nick Valentine, synth detective from Fallout 4

See also
 List of fictional computers
 List of fictional cyborgs
 List of fictional gynoids
 List of fictional military robots
 List of robots
 Android
 Gynoid
 Mecha
 Robot
 Robotic police officer
 Artificial intelligence in fiction

Notes

External links

 AMC Filmsite – Robots in Film – A Complete Illustrated History of Robots in the Movies
 Robots in Movies – over 600 movies with robots, androids, cyborgs and AI
 Robots on TV – over 300 TV series with robots, androids, cyborgs and AI
 Robot Hall of Fame at CMU – with fictional inductees HAL-9000 and R2-D2
 Round-up of fictional TV and movie robots at Den Of Geek
 Analysis of the greatest evil robots in fiction at Mahalo
 Mr ZED The Robot Comedian, David Kirk Taylor

 

Robots and androids
Robot films
Robotics lists
Science fiction themes
Video games about robots